= Buckman =

Buckman may refer to:

== People ==
- Albert Buckman Wharton, Jr. (a.k.a. Buster Wharton) (1909-1963), American rancher and polo player.
- Anjo Buckman, German rugby union international
- Bradley Buckman, American basketball player
- Clarence Buckman, (1851-1917) U.S. Congressman from Minnesota
- Edward Buckman, a Marvel Comics villain and leader of the New York branch of the Hellfire Club
- Henry Holland Buckman (1858–1914) an attorney from Duval County, Florida
- James Buckman (1814-1884), a British pharmaceutical chemist, professor, museum curator, botanist
- John Buckman, American record label founder
- Peter Buckman, English writer and literary agent
- Phil Buckman, musician, voiceover artist and actor
- Richard Buckman, New Zealand rugby union player
- Rob Buckman, Canadian doctor of medicine, comedian, author, and president of the Humanist Association of Canada
- Rosina Buckman (1881–1948), a New Zealand soprano, and a professor of singing at the Royal Academy of Music
- Sydney S. Buckman (1860–1929), British palaeontologist
- Tara Buckman, an American television and film actress
- Tom Buckman, former professional American football tight end
- Zoe Buckman, Australian runner competing

== Places ==
United States

- Buckman, Minnesota, a small city
- Buckman, New Mexico, a ghost town in Santa Fe county
- Buckman, Wisconsin, an unincorporated community
- Buckman Township, Morrison County, Minnesota
- Buckman, Portland, Oregon, a neighborhood
  - Buckman Arts Magnet Elementary School, Portland, Oregon
- Buckman and Ulmer Building, Jacksonville, Florida
- Buckman Bridge, Jacksonville, Florida
- Buckman Hall (Gainesville, Florida), University of Florida campus
- Buckman Lake, a lake in Minnesota
- Buckman Tavern, American Revolutionary War site, Lexington, Massachusetts

== Enterprises ==
- Buckman (company), global specialty chemical company headquartered in Memphis, Tennessee
