= Industrial Bio-Test Laboratories =

Former industrial product safety testing laboratory

- Founded: 1953
- Founder: Joseph C. Calandra
- Headquarters: 1810 Frontage Road; Northbrook, Illinois
- Key people: Joseph C. Calandra (President, 1953-1977); A.J. Frisque (President, 1977); Barrie M. Phillips (Vice president, Director of Research, 1977-1978; President, 1978-1979); Yvonne Bonahoom (President)
- Owner: Joseph C. Calandra (1953-1966); Nalco Holding Company (1966-)
- Number of employees: 350

Industrial Bio-Test Laboratories (IBT Labs) was an American industrial product safety testing laboratory. IBT conducted significant quantities of research for pharmaceutical companies, chemical manufacturers and other industrial clients; at its height during the 1950s, 1960s, and 1970s, IBT operated the largest facility of its kind and performed more than one-third of all toxicology testing in the United States. IBT was later confirmed of engaging in extensive scientific misconduct and fraud, which resulted in the indictment of its president and several top executives in 1981 and convictions in 1983. The revelations of misconduct by IBT Labs led to reforms in the regulation of pesticides in the United States and Canada.

== History ==
=== Early years ===
IBT was founded in 1953 by Joseph C. Calandra, an Italian American professor of pathology and biochemistry at Northwestern University. Calandra, the first of his family to pursue higher education, contributed to the concept of toxicologically innocuous doses during his tenure at Northwestern.

Described by his colleagues as a "man of high scientific standards who also knew how to make a dollar", Calandra was an effective entrepreneur; his laboratory was contracted by the Department of Defense to evaluate irradiationally preserved food within its first year of operation.

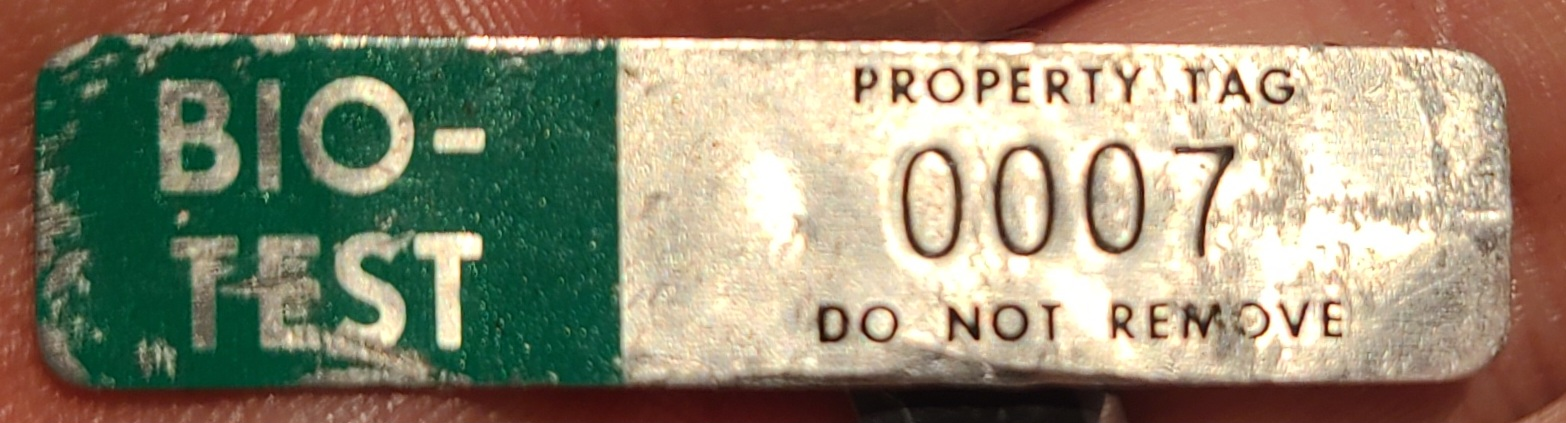
Photograph of IBT property tag.

By 1960, IBT reported that its professional staff included twelve biologists, five chemists, a mathematician, four physicians and a veterinarian, and that it employed sixteen technicians. Calandra was president and director and John H. Kay was the associate director. At that time, it listed its research areas as "industrial toxicology, food, drugs, cosmetics, pharmacology, radioisotopes, medical, dental, and veterinary products".

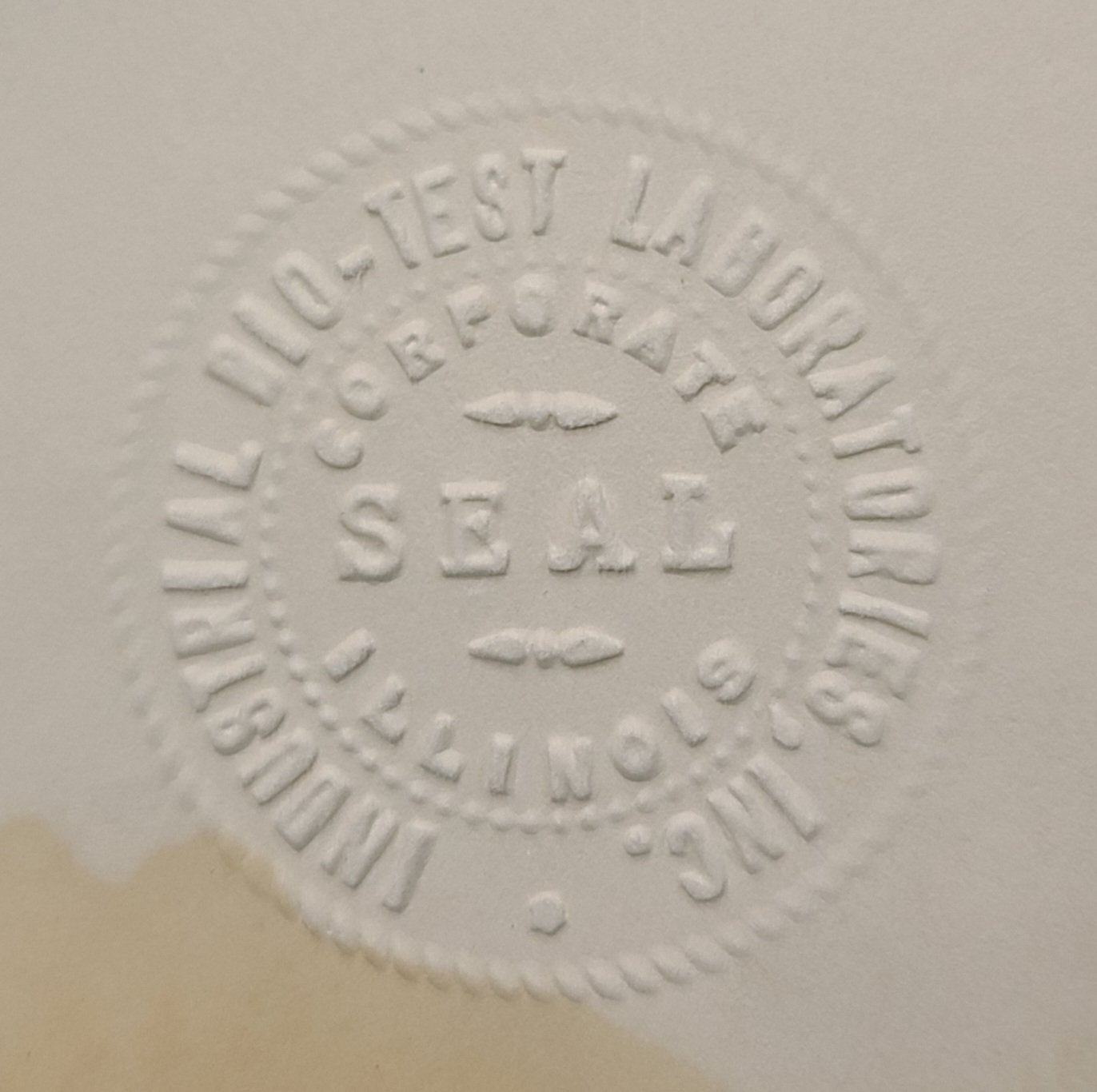
Photograph of embossed IBT corporate seal.

By the early 1960s, IBT had attained a significant reputation for producing quality work at a reasonable price. As of mid-decade, it had annual revenue estimated at nearly $2 million US.

=== 1966–1970: Nalco acquisition, expansion ===
Nalco Chemical acquired IBT in 1966 for an estimated $4.5 million. Utilizing the company's new financial prowess, Calandra oversaw considerable expansion of the company and constructed two new facilities. IBT began conducting tests on polychlorinated biphenyls (PCBs) in 1969. In 1970, Calandra began construction of a large $2 million laboratory and made two executive appointments: Moreno Keplinger as Manager of Toxicology and James Plank as Group Lead of Rat Toxicology.

=== 1971–1976: Eminence ===
In March 1971, IBT hired Paul L. Wright, one of Monsanto's toxicologists, to oversee its PCB testing. Donovan E. Gordon joined IBT as a pathologist in August 1971, and IBT finalized its safety analysis of PCBs in November 1971.

Irregularities in IBT's data were discovered in April 1976 by Adrian Gross, an investigator at the Food and Drug Administration, whose aide retrieved one of the laboratory's naproxen studies that had been conducted for Syntex, a pharmaceutical company recently outed by a whistleblower. Gross examined the study further; it struck him as being unrealistic and piqued his interest. The FDA proceeded to probe IBT, and Gross personally inspected its facilities on April 11 and July 12, 1976. During Gross' physical inspection of the laboratory, he gained access to the study's raw safety data and found frequent references to an unknown acronym, "TBD/TDA," which he said perplexed him until learning that it denoted a testing animal whose body had "too badly decomposed."

=== 1977–1983: Investigation, indictment, notoriety ===
Revelations of suspected scientific misconduct would go on to be presented in March 1977 at Senate Subcommittee on Health and Scientific Research hearings held by U.S. Senator Ted Kennedy (D-MA), in which the integrity of safety data produced by IBT, as well as G. D. Searle & Company and Biometric Testing, Inc., was publicly called into question by FDA officials. Calandra vacated his role as president of the laboratory on March 25 and was succeeded by A. J. Frisque, who had previously worked as a research executive at Nalco. Plank parted ways with IBT in April, and Philip Smith, who would later testify against the laboratory, was "fired and given 20 minutes to clean out his office" in approximately June 1977. That same month, on June 2, IBT would also shred more of its internal documents, an action which Frisque characterized in a subsequent official statement as being "entirely inadvertent."

IBT was criminally implicated in 1977 for producing fraudulent studies on widely used household and industrial products, including Nemacur, Sencor, Naprosyn, and trichlorocarbanilide. The magnitude of IBT's scientific misconduct was considered to have been extensive: 618 of 867 (71%) of studies audited by the FDA were invalidated for having "numerous discrepancies between the study conduct and data." Consequently, IBT would later be described as being "at the center of one of the most far-reaching scandals in modern science, as thousands of its studies were revealed through EPA and FDA investigations to be fraudulent or grossly inadequate."

Although the criminal case against IBT and its employees was proceeding, information about which chemicals were "suspect" because of IBT's misconduct was kept confidential by the Canadian and American government agencies responsible to regulating them.

In early 1980 the Regina Leader-Post obtained a Canadian government agency list of 106 chemicals about which there were concerns. The Regina Leader-Post also obtained a letter written Jan. 25, 1980 by R.O. Read, who was Chief of the Division of Additives and Pesticides in the Bureau of Chemical Safety Health Protection, a Branch of Canada's Health and Welfare Department, to, that said: "All long-term rodent studies and multigenerational reproductive studies performed by IBT are considered invalid," and noted that the Canadian government had sent letters to a number of chemical companies pointing out that many had "failed to submit the information required by the Environmental Protection Agency and the Canadian health protection branch." Documentation obtained from a variety of Canadian and American sources by the Regina Leader-Post included sloppy or inadequate record keeping that invalidated test results. In a number of cases, sick test animals were replaced with healthy ones, resulting in invalid test results.

In October 1983, three former officials of the company were convicted by a US federal jury of fabricating key product safety tests used to gain government approval for marketing two popular pesticides and two commonly used drugs. They were convicted after one of the longest criminal trials in US history, involving six months of testimony and nearly eleven days of jury deliberation. At the time it was regarded as "the most massive scientific scandal in the history of this country and perhaps the world." The decision was subsequently appealed and upheld in United States of America v. Moreno L. Keplinger, Paul L. Wright, and James B. Plank.

== Federal trial ==
Following the 1981 grand jury indictment of several key IBT officials, a federal trial began on April 4, 1983, to evaluate whether IBT had committed scientific fraud.

According to a May 13 article in The Wall Street Journal, "investigators charged that three big chemical companies—[Monsanto, Olin Corporation, and FMC Corporation]—knowingly submitted flawed data to the EPA in support of a widely used swimming pool chlorinator that was suspected of causing kidney and bladder problems." All three companies denied allegations of wrongdoing and reaffirmed the safety of their products.

On May 25, Cornelius Garrett testified that "[no] research animals survived the entire testing period" for either Sencor or Nemacure.

Garrett also testified that Smith instructed him to falsify subject data, which he said was a "common practice".

Smith testified that he was himself instructed by Wright to similarly falsify data on trichlorocarbanilide tests.

Calandra requested a mistrial to have cardiac surgery and received approval on July 11. Keplinger, Plank and Wright resultingly argued that they should also receive a mistrial because his absence would undermine their case, but their request was denied on July 12.

Testimony included that of an attorney retained by Nalco to defend IBT, Merrill Thompson, who refused to participate during earlier investigations of the laboratory. "As I got into it and worked on these things more, and found out more, and worked with IBT people more, and looked at the evidence of other practices in the industry, I decided I couldn't defend IBT's practices," Thompson testified. Testimony drew to a close on September 22.

Closing arguments concluded on October 4 and juror deliberation ensued. The case was decided by John Albert Nordberg on October 21, 1983.

== Aftermath ==
The United States Environmental Protection Agency (EPA) announced on July 11, 1983, that 34 pesticides would be pulled from the market unless manufacturers provided additional safety data within 90 days, although an indefinite exception was made for those who committed to do so at a later time. Environmental organizations characterized the EPA's response as insufficient and negligent, expressing a desire for more decisive action. In September 1983, the agency revealed that it was still a "long way from solving problems associated with the integrity of hundreds of studies produced by IBT and other large independent laboratories." Keith Schneider reported in the Winter 1983 edition of Amicus Journal that "IBT performed over 2,000 key product safety tests approved by federal scientists to market 212 agricultural pesticides. After a seven-year review of its files, in 1983 the EPA reported that it had determined that only 16 percent of IBT's testing results were valid. Just a handful of the invalid studies have been replaced, the agency said, and most of the pesticides continue to be sprayed on fields and forests." Good Laboratory Practice regulation in the United States resulted from the episode.

The Law Reform Commission of Canada noted in a 1987 report that Canadian agriculture's increasing dependence on pesticides had led to inaction against many of those approved on the basis of IBT's research data. Agriculture Canada banned use of Reglone until further safety testing could be conducted and evaluated by Health and Welfare Canada, though application of the chemical continued illegally on a significant majority of lentils produced. Chlorbromuron, cyprazine, dinitramine, and phosphamidon were also banned "because their manufacturers did not promise replacement studies," with Allidochlor and Captan being restricted.

== Clientele ==
According to various reports, IBT's clientele included a wide variety of companies such as 3M, American Cyanamid, American Seed, Avitrol Corp, BFC, Black Leaf Chemical, Buckman, Casoron, Chemagro, Chevron, Ciba‑Geigy, Conrel, Diamond Shamrock, Dow Corning, DuPont, FMC, Glyco, Gulf, MGK, Mobay, Mobil, Monsanto, Montedison, Nissan, Noram, Olin, Penwalt, Procter & Gamble, PPG, Sandoz, Shell, Thompson-Hayward, Uniroyal, Upjohn, US Borax, Velsicol Chemical Company, Vertac Chemical Corporation, and Zoecon, as well as the United States Army, the Department of Defense, the Environmental Protection Agency, the Food and Drug Administration, the National Cancer Institute, and the World Health Organization.

== Associated substances ==
=== Polychlorinated biphenyls ===
Eric Francis and Marie-Monique Robin have cited IBT's research into the safety of polychlorinated biphenyl, which was not investigated, as also being potentially fraudulent.

Philip Smith later testified on October 28, 1991, during a court case against Monsanto, that he had observed PCB data falsification during his employment as an assistant toxicologist at IBT.

The Ecologist claimed in a 2007 article that IBT had provided expert testimony against Douglas Gowan during a court case in which Monsanto allegedly sought to discredit and silence him over the wanton disposal of PCBs and other toxic waste at Brofiscin Quarry.

=== Other ===
In April, 1980 the Regina Leader-Post obtained and published a Canadian government list of more than 97 chemicals tested by IBT for which studies were considered "suspect". In June, 1980 an additional nine chemicals were added. According to Fagin and Lavelle in Toxic Deception, Wright tampered with safety data for Machete and monosodium cyanurate, both Monsanto products. IBT performed safety tests on Dinoseb, which was later discovered to cause birth defects and then pulled from the U.S. market in 1986. IBT also originally evaluated the safety of atrazine, a herbicide now thought to be an endocrine disruptor, suspected carcinogen, and possible teratogen.

== See also ==
- Contract research organization
- Craven Laboratories
- Good Laboratory Practice
- Pesticide regulation in the United States
- List of scientific misconduct incidents
