= Tim Heywood =

Geoffrey Beresford Heywood MBE DL (July 12, 1914 – June 15, 2006), known as Tim Heywood, was a British Army officer and bureaucrat. He served as the chief signals officer of the Long Range Desert Group (LRDG). Later, he was president of the Country Landowners' Association (CLA) and founder president of the European Landowners' Association.

Heywood was born in Newcastle. His father was a stockbroker. He was educated at Eton, where he built radios in his spare time. He became an accountant, and was commissioned into the Royal Corps of Signals (Middlesex Yeomanry) in 1939. His regiment was sent to Palestine with the 1st Cavalry Division in 1940. He volunteered to join the Long Range Desert Group and was interviewed by Major Ralph Bagnold and Captain Bill Shaw in Cairo. He joined the LRDG and became its chief signals officer in August 1941, in charge of its special radio equipment, its codes, and the communications group at the Group's headquarters.

Heywood was demobilised as a Major, and awarded the MBE. He attended the Royal Agricultural College in Cirencester, and became a farmer, and became active in landowners' representative associations.

He served as a governor, chairman of the governors (1980-1985), and vice-president of the Royal Agricultural College. During his time as president, the College was approved to award academic degrees, and admitted the first women. He was awarded the College's Bledisloe Gold Medal in 1989 for services to agriculture. He was also a Deputy Lieutenant of Gloucestershire, district commissioner of the Boy Scouts, and a general commissioner of income tax

He married twice, first in 1946 (later divorced) and again in 1977. He was survived by his second wife, and a son and two daughters from his first marriage.
