= Joseph Regenstein Jr. =

Joseph Regenstein Jr. (4 November 1923 – 4 March 1999) was an American business leader and philanthropist who donated more than $105 million to various Chicago area institutions as President of the Joseph and Helen Regenstein Foundation.

The son of Joseph Regenstein, Regenstein served in the United States Army Air Forces during World War II.

He graduated from the McCormick School of Engineering and Applied Science at Northwestern University in 1946. He served as chairman and president of Velsicol Chemical Corp. until 1965 and was chairman of the board for the Arvey Corp., a paper-products firm created by his grandfather, until his family sold the company in 1988.

Regenstein provided funds for numerous community-centered projects. Beneficiaries included the Chicago Botanic Garden, the Lincoln Park Zoo, the Regenstein Hall of Music for Northwestern University, and the Joseph Regenstein Library at the University of Chicago. Other funding recipients included the Brookfield Zoo, the John G. Shedd Aquarium, Michael Reese Hospital and Medical Center, and the Field Museum of Natural History.

He died of cancer at Northwestern Memorial Hospital. The Joseph Regenstein Jr. School of the Chicago Botanic Garden was named in his honor.
