= Peter Walton =

Peter Walton may refer to:

- Peter Walton (rugby union) (born 1969), Scottish rugby player and coach
- Peter Walton (referee) (born 1959), English referee
- Peter Walton, character in Alias John Preston
