= Department of Forest Biomaterials =

- Type: Public research department
- Established: 1948
- Parent institution: North Carolina State University
- Head of Department: Jingxin Wang
- Location: Raleigh, North Carolina, United States
- Affiliations: College of Natural Resources
- Website: cnr.ncsu.edu/fb/

The Department of Forest Biomaterials at North Carolina State University (NC State) is an academic department specializing in the study and development of forest-based materials, bioenergy, and sustainability. The department is part of the College of Natural Resources.

== Research Areas ==
- Bioenergy
- Sustainable Biomaterials
- Forest Products
- Environmental Sustainability

== Education ==
Undergraduate and graduate programs (#1 in Wood Science & Wood Products/Pulp & Paper Technology in 2024 in the United States), including Bachelor's, Master's, and Ph.D. degrees. Courses cover topics such as wood science, bioenergy, sustainable biomaterials, and environmental sustainability.

- Master of Science in Forest Biomaterials
- Master of Forest Biomaterials (non-thesis)
- Distance Master of Forest Biomaterials (online-only)
- Ph.D. in Forest Biomaterials

== Collaborations and Partnerships ==
The Department of Forest Biomaterials collaborates with various institutions, organizations, and industries:

- University of British Columbia
- Aalto University
- Auburn University
- Georgetown University
- USDA
- Department of Energy
- WestRock
- Valmet
- Cascades
- Adidas
- Unilever
- Kimberly-Clark
- Rayonier Advanced Materials
- Procter & Gamble
- CMPC (company)
- Suzano
- Eastman
- Essity
- International Paper
- Andritz AG
- Nalco Water

== Faculty ==
- Dimitris S. Argyropoulos
- Ali Ayoub
- Medwick Byrd Jr
- Edward Funkhouser
- Ronalds W. Gonzalez
- Martin Hubbe
- Hasan Jameel
- John Kadla
- Bo Kasal
- Frederik Laleicke
- Kai Lan
- Nathalie Lavoine
- Lucian Lucia
- Marian McCord
- Lokendra Pal
- Sunkyu Park
- Melissa Pasquinelli
- Joel Pawlak
- Perry Peralta
- Ilona Peszlen
- Richard Phillips
- Rico Ruffino
- Daniel Saloni
- David Tilotta
- Richard Venditti
- Jingxin Wang
- Yuan Yao

== Faculty Emeritus ==
- Hou-min Chang
- John Heitmann Jr
- Stephen Kelley
- Adrianna Kirkman
- Michael Kocurek
- Philip Mitchell
- Elisabeth Wheeler

== Postdoctoral Scholars ==
- Nelson Barrios
- Sharmita Bera
- Seong-Min Cho
- Karthik Ananth Mani
- Raman Rao
- Md Imrul Reza Shishir
- Song Wang
- Saurabh K Kardam

== Staff ==
- Shelley Barry
- Brittany Hayes
- Olivia Lenahan
- Shannon Lora
- Ronald Marquez
- Beverly Miller
- Julie Paradiso
- Melissa Rabil
- Jessica Rogers
- Angela Rush
- Elisha Swartz
- Loi Tran
