= Ronalds W. Gonzalez =

American-Venezuelan academic (born 1980)

- Born: Acarigua, Venezuela
- Education: University of the Andes; North Carolina State University
- Scientific career
- Fields: Engineering, biomaterials, sustainability
- Workplaces: North Carolina State University

Ronalds W. Gonzalez is an American-Venezuelan academic born in Barrio Bolívar, Acarigua, Portuguesa, Venezuela, in 1980. He is an associate professor in the Department of Forest Biomaterials at North Carolina State University. Professor Gonzalez is a global thought leader at the intersection of sustainability and alternative fibers, where he is developing ground-breaking scientific work to profile the carbon footprint of emerging fibers used in the hygiene tissue, packaging, and textiles industries.

== Scientific Work ==
Prof. Gonzalez works focus on improving the understanding of how to profile fibers related to their sustainability. In 2021 he co-established the major global research center focusing in sustainable and alternative fibers. He has also contributed to research on valorization of waste materials, including biomass conversion. and technoeconomic analysis. He is a co-editor of the Journal Forest, and a consultant for the hygiene tissue and personal care industry. He is a regular instructor at Boku University, Austria, since 2019, and invited lecturer at Aalto University, Finland, 2024, in the subject of techno-economic analysis and life cycle assessment. He has also served as a consultant for the United States International Trade Commission.

Prof. Gonzalez is the Director of Conversion, Economics & Sustainability (ConEcSus) and the SAFI Consortium. He received the Best Research Award from the American Cleaning Institute in 2023, the Chancellor Innovation Fund Award, and was named Faculty Scholar at NC State University in 2019. Additionally, he received the Best Presentation Award from the Associação Brasileira Técnica de Celulose e Papel in 2019.

SAFI collaborates with institutions and companies such as the BioProducts Institute at the University of British Columbia, Auburn University, Georgetown University, private companies (Familia, WestRock, Valmet, Cascades, Adidas, Unilever, Mercer, Kimberly-Clark, Rayonier Advanced Materials, Procter & Gamble, CMPC, Suzano, Eastman, Essity, International Paper, PSF, Genera Energy, Andritz, Treeco, Nalco Water, Tech Trade, Red Leaf Pulp, National Bamboo, Caboo), federal agencies (Sun Grant Initiative, USDA), and non-profit organizations (Rockefeller Foundation, Climate Breakthrough, and Canopy).
