= VSD =

VSD may refer to:

- .vsd, a file extension for Microsoft Visio diagrams
- VSD (French magazine) (Vendredi Samedi Dimanche; i.e. "Friday Saturday Sunday"), a French weekly news magazine
- Vaccine Safety Datalink, a Centers for Disease Control database containing vaccination and health records of over 7 million Americans
- Variable speed drive, or adjustable-speed drive, is a specific type of a variable-frequency drive
- Visible-surface determination, also known as hidden-surface determination
- Video Single Disc, a video disc format based on laserdisc that only was popular in Japan and the rest of Asia
- Voluntary Service Detachment, an Australian civil organization during World War II
- State Security Department of Lithuania, a Lithuanian intelligence agency
- Ventilation shutdown, a means of killing livestock

== Medicine ==
- Ventricular septal defect, a defect in the ventricular septum of the heart
- Virtually safe dose, a concept in regulatory toxicology, applied to carcinogens with no threshold of effects

== Places ==
- Vallivue School District, a school district in Idaho, United States
- Vancouver Public Schools, a school district in Vancouver, Washington, United States
- Vancouver School District, a school district in Vancouver, British Columbia, Canada
- Vicksburg-Warren School District, a school district based in Vicksburg, Mississippi, United States
