= Velsicol Chemical Corporation =

American chemical company based in Illinois

- Industry: Chemical industry
- Founded: 1931
- Founder: Joseph Regenstein; Julius Hyman
- Headquarters: Rosemont, Illinois, U.S.
- Products: Pesticides; Plasticizers
- Website: www.velsicol.com

Velsicol Chemical Corporation is an American chemical company based in Rosemont, Illinois, that specializes in chemical intermediates for applications such as agrochemicals. It was founded in 1931 by Joseph Regenstein and Julius Hyman.

== History ==
When, in 1962, the landmark anti-pesticide book Silent Spring was first published, Velsicol was the sole manufacturer of two pesticides – chlordane and heptachlor – featured prominently within it. Subsequently, these pesticides were banned. At the time, Velsicol threatened legal action against Silent Spring's publisher Houghton Mifflin, though ultimately no such action was taken. In 1979, Australian politician and medical researcher John Coulter gave a lecture that mentioned how Velsicol had handled information about the cancer-causing properties of the two pesticides. Velsicol contacted the director of the Institute of Medical and Veterinary Science (now SA Pathology), where Coulter worked, about the lecture. Coulter lost his job in early 1980. In a later court hearing, however, none of the reasons that were given for the dismissal were found to be substantiated. (Note: This is taken from the introduction of the book, which can be found online here: https://www.bmartin.cc/pubs/86is/introduction.html)

For years, Velsicol produced polybrominated biphenyls, DDT, cattle feed additives, and various other chemicals at its Michigan Chemical Corporation plant in St. Louis, Michigan. In 1973, a packaging error at the plant resulted in several thousand pounds of PBBs contaminating cattle feed which was later fed to animals across Michigan. When the error was finally recognized, all the cattle in the state were culled. This error led directly to Gerald Ford's half-hearted approval in 1976 of the Toxic Substances Control Act, which "remains one of the most controversial regulatory bills ever passed". The site of the St. Louis plant is one of the costliest Superfund sites in America. In 2014, the neighborhood around the plant was found to be contaminated with DDT, presumably by Velsicol decades before, prompting the removal and replacement of soil at 96 residential properties.

In 2005, Velsicol was acquired by the private equity firm Arsenal Capital Partners, who, in 2007, re-branded the unit manufacturing benzoic acid, sodium benzoate, and specialty plasticizers as Genovique Specialties Corporation. Arsenal still owns Velsicol. They began selling benzoic acid and sodium benzoate again in 2015 and 2017 respectively.

== Endrin ==
Endrin is a solid organochlorine pesticide developed by Velsicol with the molecular formula of C_{12}H_{8}Cl_{6}O. The colorless and odorless crystalline solid is dissolved in a liquid for pesticide use against rodents, insects, and birds. The compound is widely regarded as an environmental hazard, showing acute toxicity in humans and severe toxicity in animals, specifically aquatic wildlife as well.

Humans can be exposed to Endrin by inhalation, skin absorption, or ingestion. There are many adverse health effects that are associated with endrin. According to the CDC, several studies have shown that people exposed to high levels of endrin experience convulsions, jerking of legs and arms, twitching facial muscles, sudden collapse, or even death. Studies have also shown that animals who have eaten and breathed the same high levels of endrin had very similar health effects as humans.

Although there are no long-term effects on human health directly linked to endrin, its ability to create temporary illness caused the substance to be banned from being used as an insecticide and eventually the production of endrin altogether within the United States. Because of the potentially harmful adverse effects of endrin on human health and wildlife, the chemical was officially banned on October 10, 1984. However, production of endrin wasn’t canceled until 1991 in the United States.

United states vs. Velsicol Chemical Corp. The civil court imposed a $30,000 penalty on Velsicol on August 31, 1978, for more than 300 violations of the NPDES permit which restricts the releases of pesticides endrin and more into sewage.

=== Endrin environmental effects ===
Endrin has minimal effect on soil, however from the Velsicol Chemical Corporation handbook, endrin is “toxic to fish and wildlife” and it is recommended that endrin is “kept out of lakes, streams and ponds”. Endrin is meant to be properly handled. The recommendations by Vesicol are “do not contaminate water”. In case fish kills, fish must be collected promptly and disposed of by buna”.

According to InChem,”high toxicity of endrin can cause acute environmental problems when there are uncontrolled discharges during its manufacture, formulation or use.” InChem also recommends that “The manufacture, formulation, agricultural use, and disposal of endrin should be carefully managed to minimize contamination of the environment, particularly surface waters.

== See also ==
- Sterling v. Velsicol Chemical Corp

== Notes ==
1. This is taken from the introduction of the book, which can be found online here: https://www.bmartin.cc/pubs/86is/introduction.html
