= Aubrey Jackman =

English hotelier (1921 - 2010)

Aubrey Francis Jackman MBE (2 April 1921 - 18 September 2010) was a leading producer of international military tattoos and prominent hotelier in Bath, England. Born in Bath in 1921, Jackman's family owned a number of hotels in the city, including the Lansdown Grove, Pulteney Hotel and Fernley (now known as the Abbey) Hotel. Following the outbreak of World War II, Jackman attempted to join the British Army, but with his agricultural experience (having studied at the Royal Agricultural College) he was instead sent to work on a farm in Somerset.

In 1940 Jackman enlisted in the Local Defence Volunteers (Home Guard). He was then later permitted to join the Somerset Light Infantry as an officer in February 1941, rising to the rank of Major. Jackman's military postings included Egypt, Palestine, Lebanon, Greece, Italy and Austria. He became heavily involved in organising entertainment for the troops, and ended his Army career in 1947, have been demobilised without ever having to fire a shot in anger.

On his return to England, Jackman took over the family hotel business, also taking on the role of president of the Bath Hoteliers' and Restaurateurs' Association for 40 years, while still keeping in touch with his military roots. From the mid-1950s to mid-1960s he was producer and director of the Bath Tattoo and also the Wembley Military Pageant and Cardiff Searchlight Tattoo. In 1967 Jackman travelled to Canada as Production Consultant to the Canadian Armed Forces Tattoo 1967, still the world's largest travelling show, produced by Colonel Ian Fraser. Jackman thereafter became consultant of the Royal Nova Scotia International Tattoo. In 1977 he was producer for the Wembley Pageant given in honour of Her Majesty Queen Elizabeth II's Silver Jubilee. Through his work with military tattoos in the UK and overseas, also including those in Oman and Luxembourg, Jackman was appointed Chairman of the International Association of Tattoo Organisers (IATO).

Jackman was also onetime chairman of Bath Conservative Association, and a supporter of the Army Benevolent Fund, the Royal Artillery Association, and the Soldiers, Sailors, Airmen and Families Association. He was also involved with the Armistice Day parades in the city of Bath.

Major Jackman died in 2010, at the age of 89, having just finished writing his autobiography 'The Spice of Life', named after a march written for Jackman by Commander Jack McGuire, Director of Music Emeritus of the Royal Nova Scotia International Tattoo. Jackman's funeral was held at Bath Abbey on Monday 4 October 2010. He is buried in the family crypt in the Victorian graveyard at Beckford Tower, Bath.

== See also ==
- Military Tattoo
1. Canadian Armed Forces Tattoo 1967
1. Colonel Fraser and Aubrey Jackman
