= Edward William Prevost =

Prof Edward William Prevost FRSE FIC (1851–1920) was a 19th-century British chemist, philologist and linguist. In authorship he is known as E. W. Prevost.

== Life ==
He was born in Carlisle in 1851 the son of Col Thomas William Prevost, a Staff Officer in the Pensions Department of the British Army. He was educated at Glenalmond School in Scotland then at Rugby School from 1864 to 1867. He studied chemistry at the University of Heidelberg gaining a doctorate (PhD).

He was elected a Fellow of the Royal Society of Edinburgh in 1875. His proposers were Alexander Crum Brown, Sir James Dewar, Philip Kelland and Peter Guthrie Tait.

In 1879 he became Professor of Chemistry at the Royal Agricultural College in Cirencester. He retired from academia in 1881, aged only 30. Although his father appears to have retired to Edinburgh around 1885, living at 25 Moray Place it is unclear if Edward stayed at the same house. He eventually left society in its wider sense to become a farmer, firstly near Tamworth and later at Elton near Newnham. During this period he concentrated also on writing.

== Freemasonry ==
He was Initiated into Scottish Freemasonry in Lodge Holyrood House (St. Luke's), No.44, (Edinburgh) on 17 January 1878.

== Death ==
He died on 7 October 1920 at Ross-on-Wye in Herefordshire.

== Publications ==
- The Dialect of Cumberland (1905)

== Family ==
He may be the father of Edward William du Teissier Prevost, born in Edinburgh in 1885.
