= Craven Laboratories =

American research company

- Headquarters: Austin, Texas, United States
- Owner: Dr. Don Allen Craven (1993)

Craven Laboratories was an American research company based in Austin, Texas.

== History ==
Craven Laboratories was the first chemical testing lab charged in the United States following the establishment of the Food and Drug Administration's Good Laboratory Practices regulations.

== Scientific fraud ==
=== Investigation ===
The Environmental Protection Agency announced on March 1, 1991, that it was investigating Craven Laboratories for "allegedly falsifying test data used by chemical firms to win EPA approval of pesticides." The investigation was coordinated by the EPA Office of Prevention, Pesticides, and Toxic Substances, DOJ Environmental Crimes Division, and the United States Attorney.

=== Indictments ===
In 1991, a federal grand jury indicted the laboratory's owner, Don Allen Craven, with felony counts of conspiracy, mail fraud, making false statements, concealment of material facts, and obstructing EPA proceedings. The head of the Quality Assurance Unit was also charged, as were several lab technicians.

=== Scope ===
At least 48 chemicals were approved on the basis of Craven's fraudulent research, 28 of which remained on the market in New Zealand as of 1993. In total, the FDA reported that Craven performed safety analysis for 262 companies.

=== Aftermath ===
Following the conclusion of the EPA's investigation, the Department of Justice announced on February 25, 1994, that the president of Craven Laboratories and fourteen of its former employees were adjudged guilty for the falsification of research data.

Monsanto has stated the Craven Labs investigation was started by the EPA after a pesticide industry task force discovered irregularities, that the studies had been repeated, and that Roundup's EPA certification does not now use any studies from Craven Labs.

== Legal cases ==
Following Craven Laboratory's investigation, 11 multinational corporations filed suit against Craven for losses secondary to its misconduct.

== See also ==
- Good Laboratory Practice
- Industrial Bio-Test Laboratories
- Pesticide regulation in the United States
