= Theodore Regensteiner =

German-born printer and engineer

- Born: May 17, 1868; Munich, Germany
- Died: July 15, 1952 (aged 84); Chicago, United States

Theodore Regensteiner (born May 17, 1868, in Munich, Germany, to Albert (Abraham) (?-1904 in Pasing) from Pflaumloch and his first wife Fannie, née Heymann. He had an older brother Siegfried (1866-1927) founder of the Automobilwerk Pasing near Munich. Theodore lost his mother age 3 and his stepmother Bertha, mother of Martin (?-1909 in Chicago) and Otto (1877-1941 in Kaunas) became a determining factor in bringing about his emigration in 1884 (he was age 15) to the USA. His father was the founder of the Albert Regensteiner Mechanische Schuhfabrik - Export - Engros in Pasing near Munich. Theodore R. established himself in Chicago where he joined the printing and publishing business. He is known for inventing the four-color lithographic press in 1894 when he requested an extra black plate in addition to the three traditional primaries for the printing of the Christmas issue of Century Magazine. He died July 15, 1952, in Chicago, Illinois.

Regensteiner was an executive of the American Colortype Company, which he left after a management dispute in 1906. In June 1907, he founded The Regensteiner Colortype Corporation, which in 1921 became the Regensteiner Corporation.

== Literature ==
- Gudrun Azar et al. 'Ins Licht gerückt. Jüdische Lebenswege im Münchner Westen'. München 2008, 159-160, Herbert Utz Verlag, ISBN 978-3-8316-0787-7 (Katalog der gleichnamigen Ausstellung in der Pasinger Fabrik, 10. April bis 25. Mai 2008).

== Link ==
- Joseph Regenstein
- Regensteiner-Linde in Pasing Helenes Linde Sueddeutsche Zeitung
- Automobilwerk Pasing Siegfried Regensteiner
