= Chicago Botanic Garden =

Botanical garden in Illinois, US

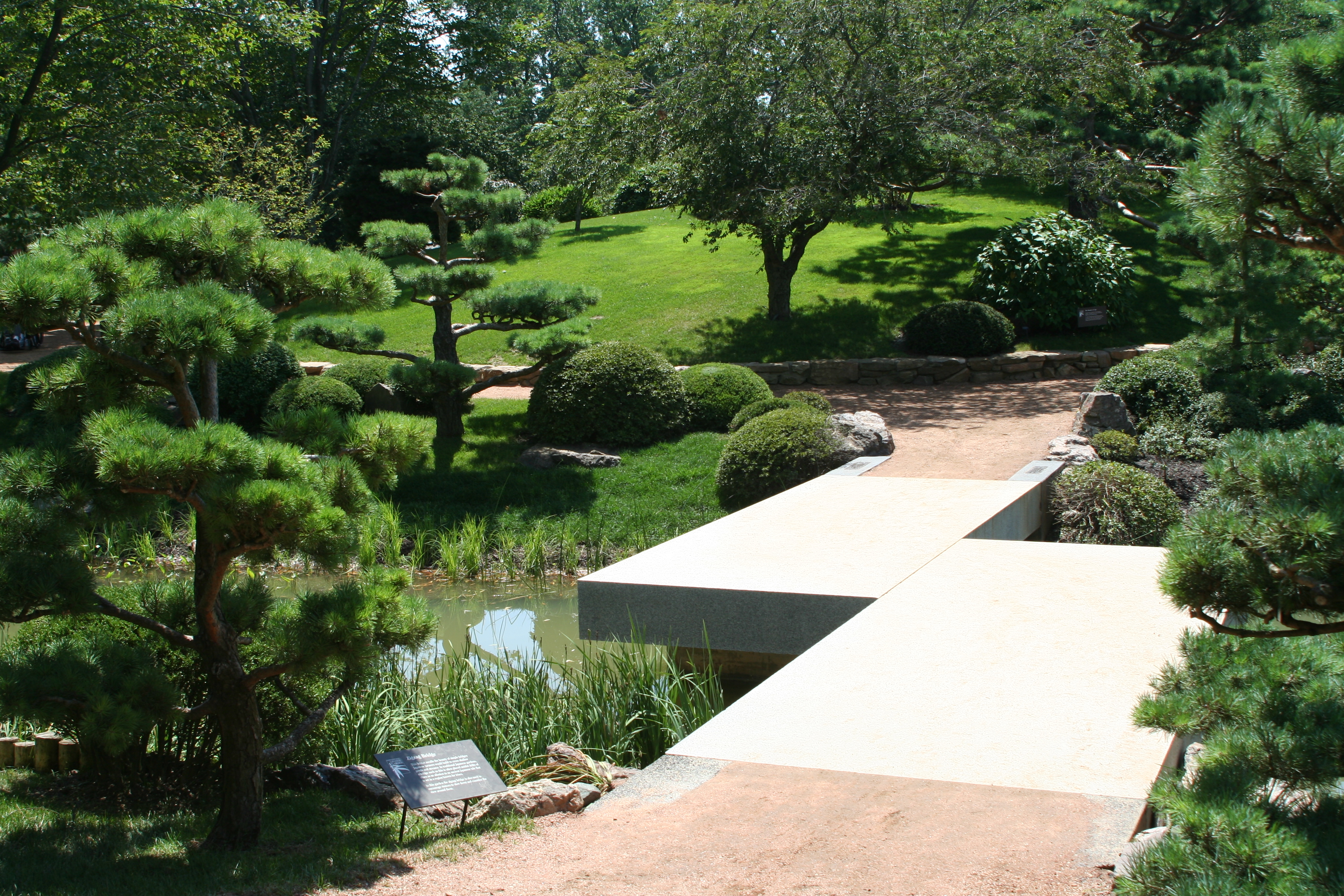
- A zig-zag bridge at the Chicago Botanic Garden
- Interactive map of Chicago Botanic Garden
- Type: Botanical
- Location: 1000 Lake Cook Road, Glencoe, Illinois
- Coordinates: 42°8′54″N 87°47′24″W
- Area: 385 acres (156 ha)
- Opened: 1972; 54 years ago
- Owner: Forest Preserve District of Cook County
- Visitors: 953,846 (2011)
- Status: Open year-round
- Plants: 2.5 million
- Parking: Paid parking, free to Garden members
- Public transit: UPN at Braeside and Glencoe; Pace
- Website: www.chicagobotanic.org

The Chicago Botanic Garden is a 385-acre (156 ha) botanical garden situated on nine islands in the northern Cook County Forest Preserves within the nominal geographical boundaries of Glencoe, Illinois. It features 27 display gardens and five natural habitats including Mary Mix McDonald Woods, Barbara Brown Nature Reserve, Dixon Prairie, the Skokie River Corridor, and the Lakes and Shorelines. The garden is open every day of the year. An admissions fee was first charged in 2022.

The Garden is owned by the Forest Preserve District of Cook County and managed by the Chicago Horticultural Society. It opened to the public in 1972, and is home to the Joseph Regenstein Jr. School which offers educational classes and certificate programs, and participates with the botany staff in research and conservation programs.

The Chicago Botanic Garden is accredited by the American Alliance of Museums and is a member of the American Public Gardens Association.

== Architecture ==
The architectural design for the Chicago Botanic Garden began with the creation of the master plan by John O. Simonds and Geoffrey Rausch. Several famous buildings have been designed by well-known architects since 1976.

- 1976: Education Center, Edward Larabee Barnes
- 1982: Japanese Garden, Koichi Kawana
- 1983: Heritage Garden, Geoffrey Rausch
- 2004: Esplanade, Dan Kiley
- 2009: Conservation Science Center, Booth Hansen

== Conservation ==
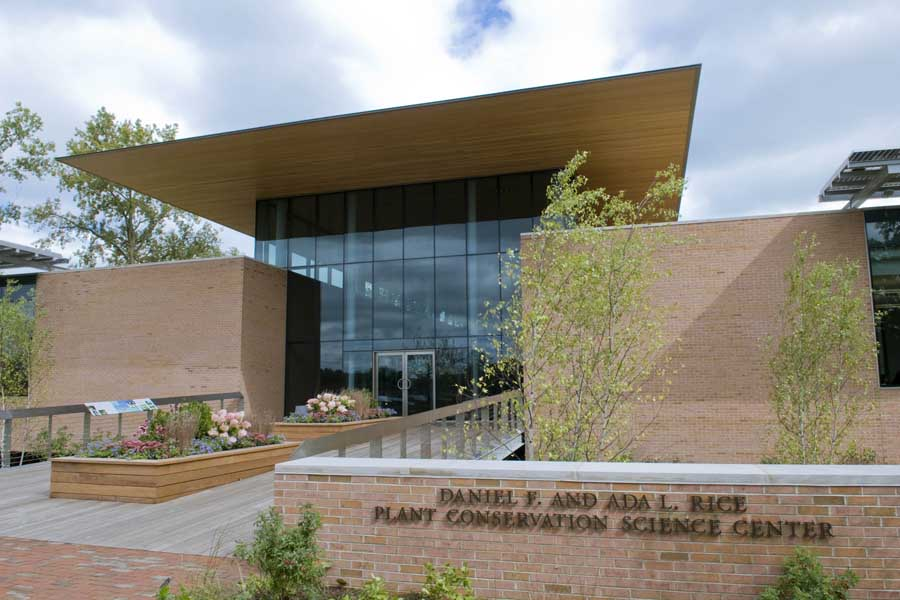
Daniel F. and Ada L. Rice Plant Conservation Science Center

The Chicago Botanic Garden opened the Daniel F. and Ada L. Rice Plant Conservation Science Center on its ground on September 23, 2009. In September 2010, the Plant Conservation Science Center earned a Gold LEED (Leadership in Energy and Environmental Design) rating from the U.S. Green Building Council for its sustainable design. The building features a green roof garden.

Scientists working at the Chicago Botanic Garden contribute to rare plant species conservation research and are active in regional, national and international organizations that promote plant conservation. The garden is a partner in the Seeds of Success project, a branch of the Millennium Seed Bank Partnership managed by the Royal Botanic Gardens, Kew. The goal is to collect 10,000 seeds from each of 1,500 native species of the Midwest for conservation and restoration efforts. The garden also leads the Plants of Concern initiative to monitor rare species in northeastern and southern Illinois.

== Sustainability ==
The first generation of sustainable gardens at the Chicago Botanic Garden were the victory gardens of World Wars I and II. Today's gardens incorporate food and paper scrap composting, sustainable irrigation, and a minimal use of fertilizer and pesticides. The Chicago Botanic Garden also encourages others to garden sustainably by composting food waste, installing backyard rain barrels, using native plants, removing invasive species, and establishing perennials. The Windy City Harvest program offers workshops in sustainable urban horticulture and urban agriculture.

In 2010, the Corporate Roundtable on Sustainability was established to encourage companies to act sustainably.

== Honors and awards ==
In 2006, the Chicago Botanic Garden received the Award for Garden Excellence, given yearly by the APGA and Horticulture magazine to a public garden that exemplifies the highest standards of horticultural practices and has shown a commitment to supporting and demonstrating best gardening practices.

In 2012, the Chicago Botanic Garden was chosen as one of 10 "Great Place" (Public Space) for providing food locally, excellence in design, education and outreach, and sustainability by the American Planning Association, which selects "Great Places" in the United States annually to highlight good places for people to work and to live, representing a "true sense of place, cultural and historical interest".

== Gallery ==
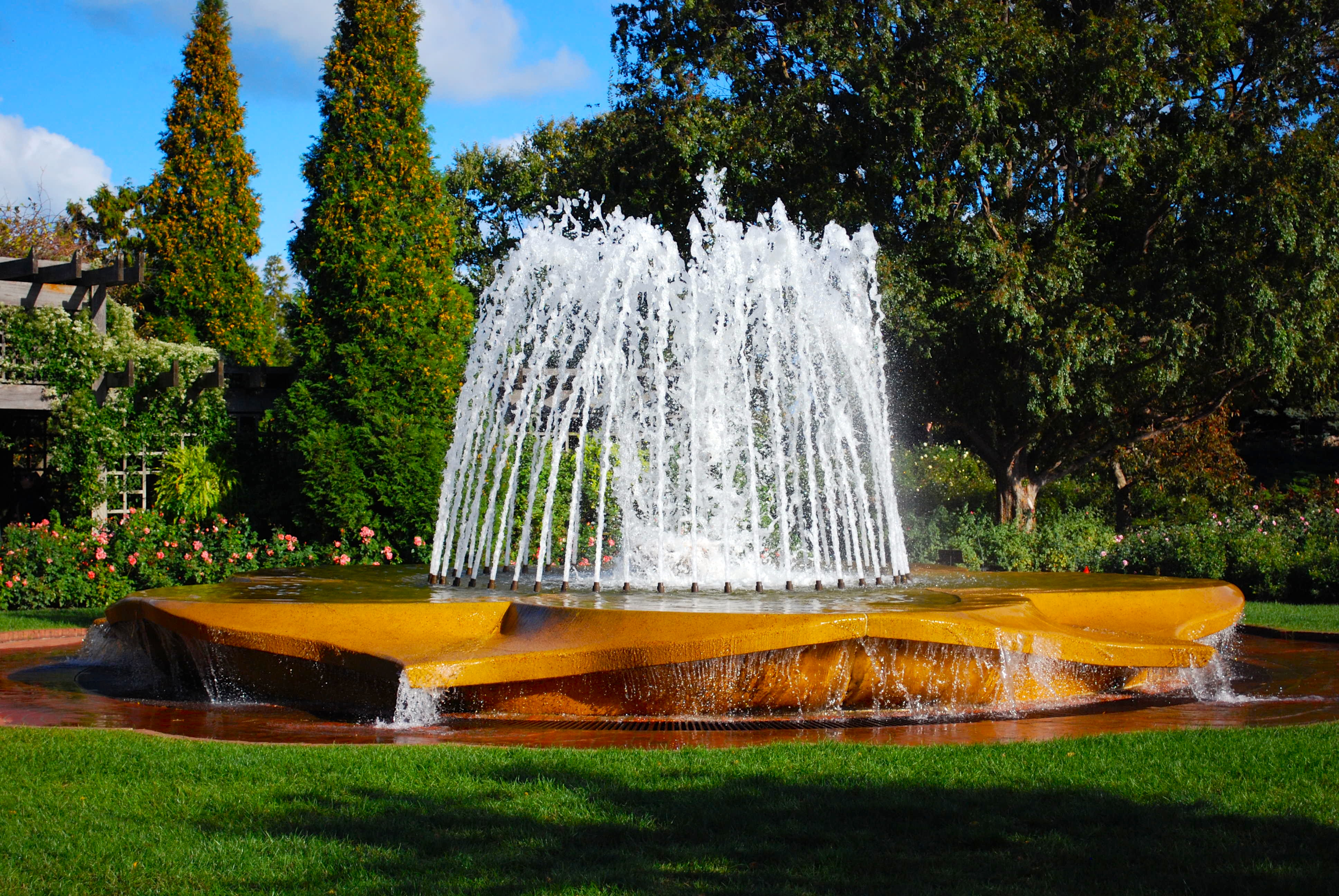
One of the many fountains in the gardens

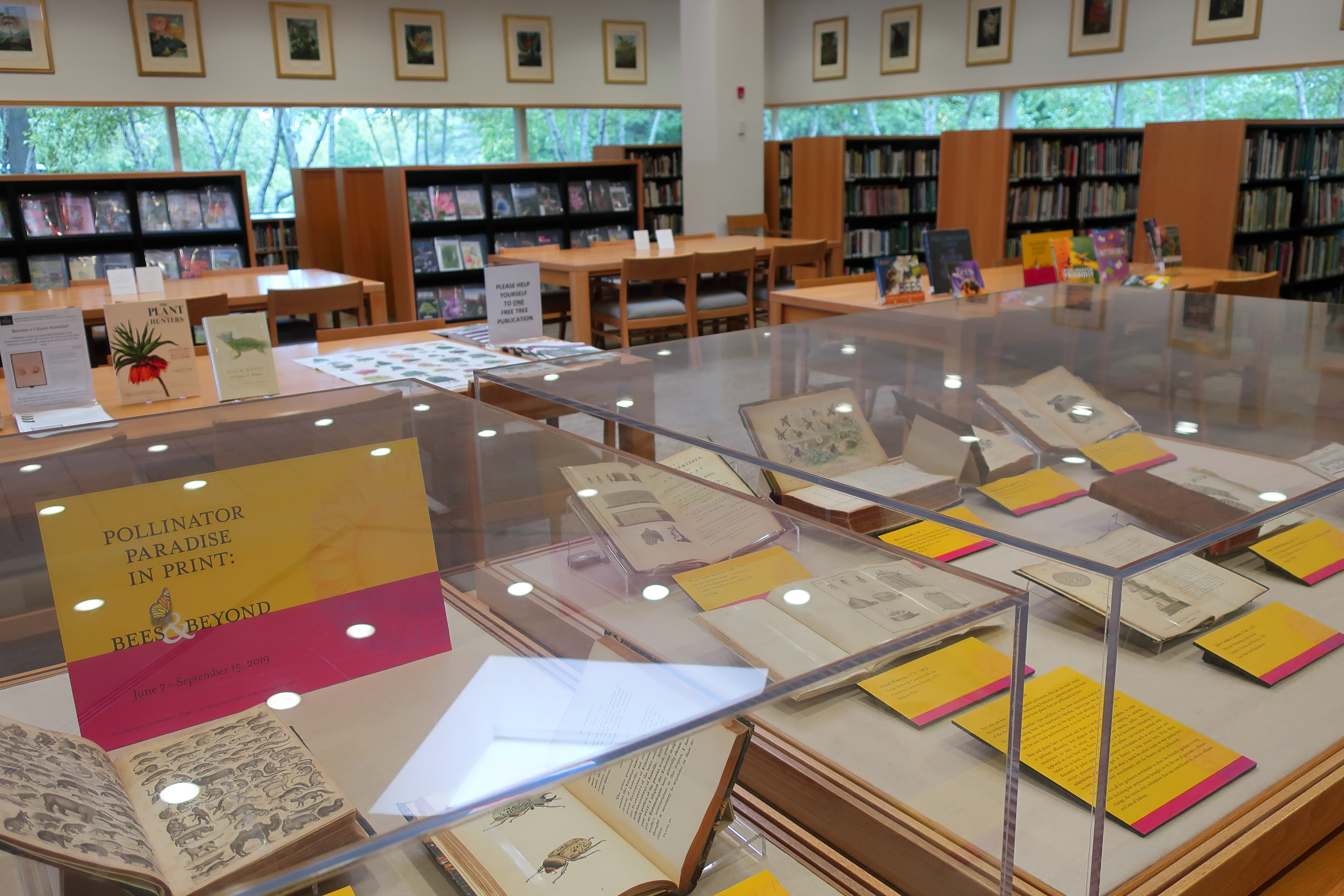
Regenstein Center, Lenhardt Library

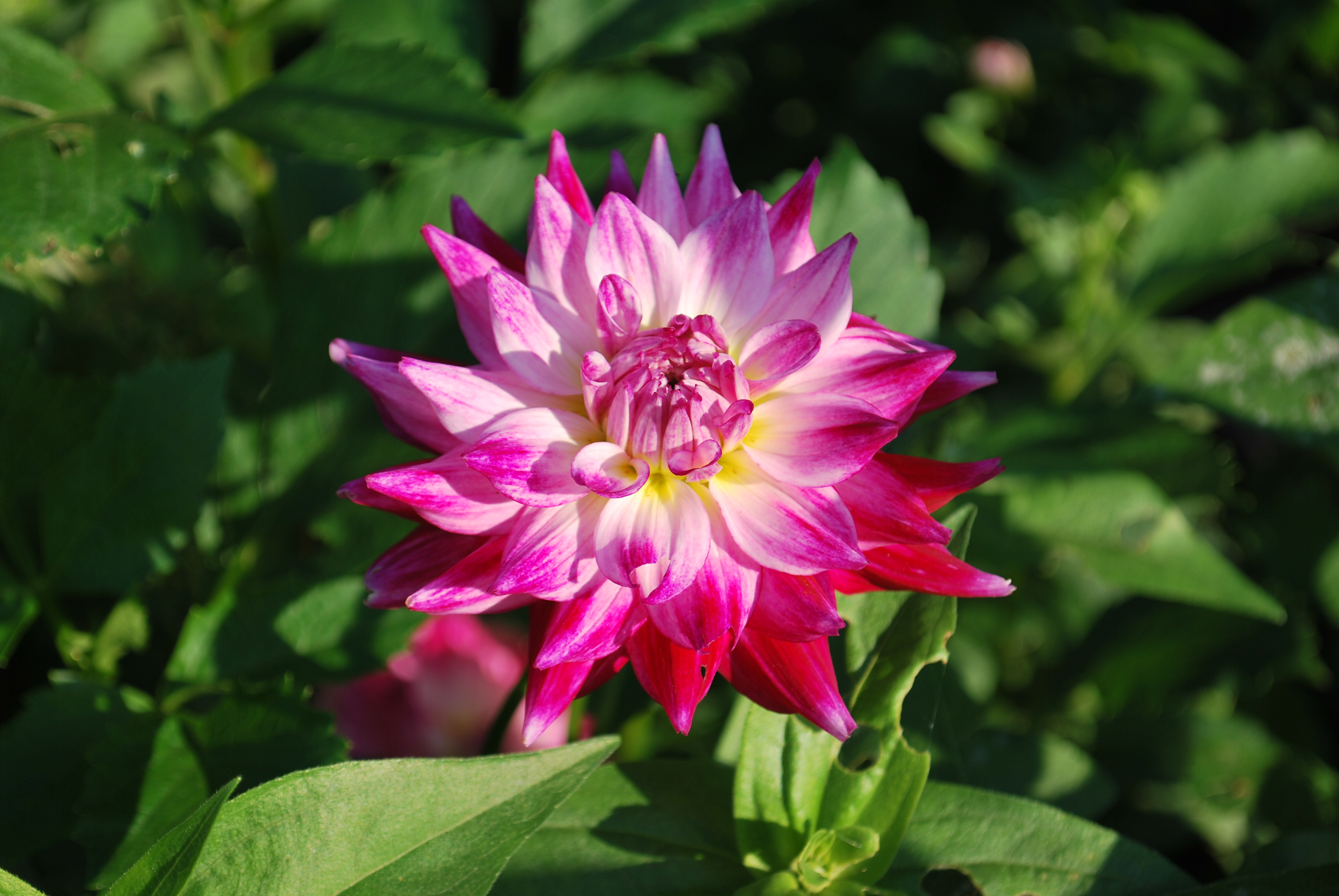
A flower in bloom

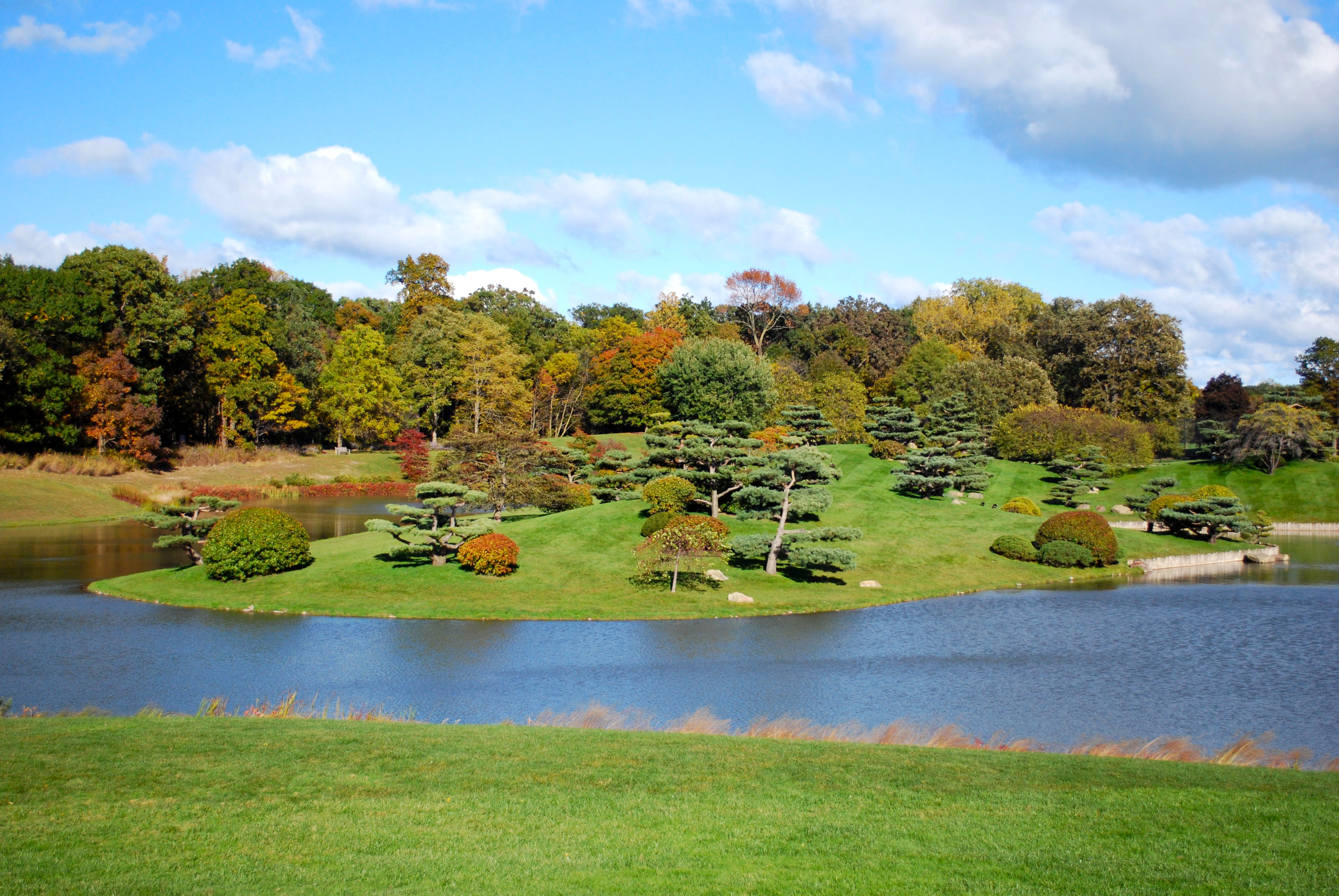
Overlooking part of the gardens

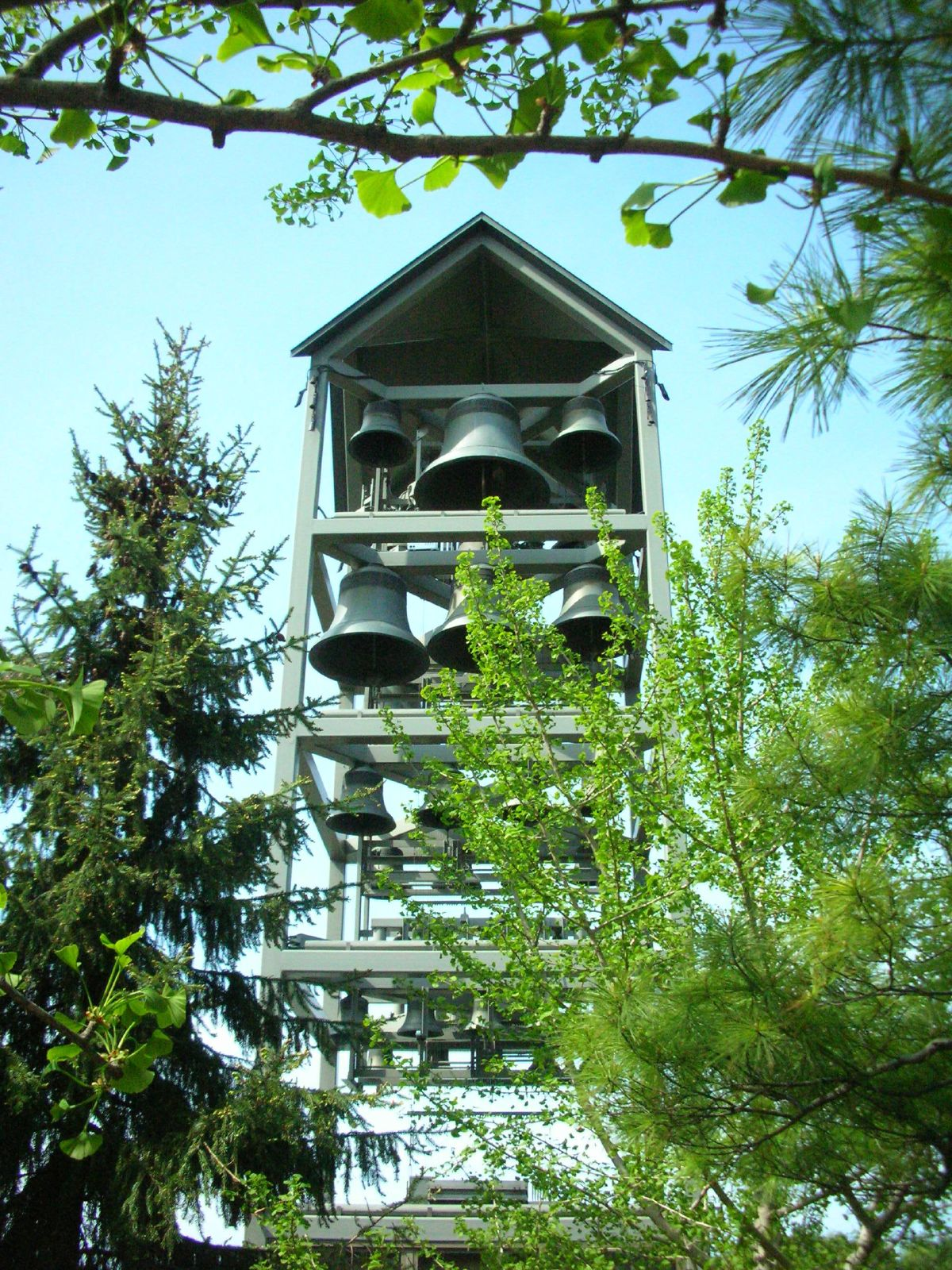
Carillon as seen through the trees

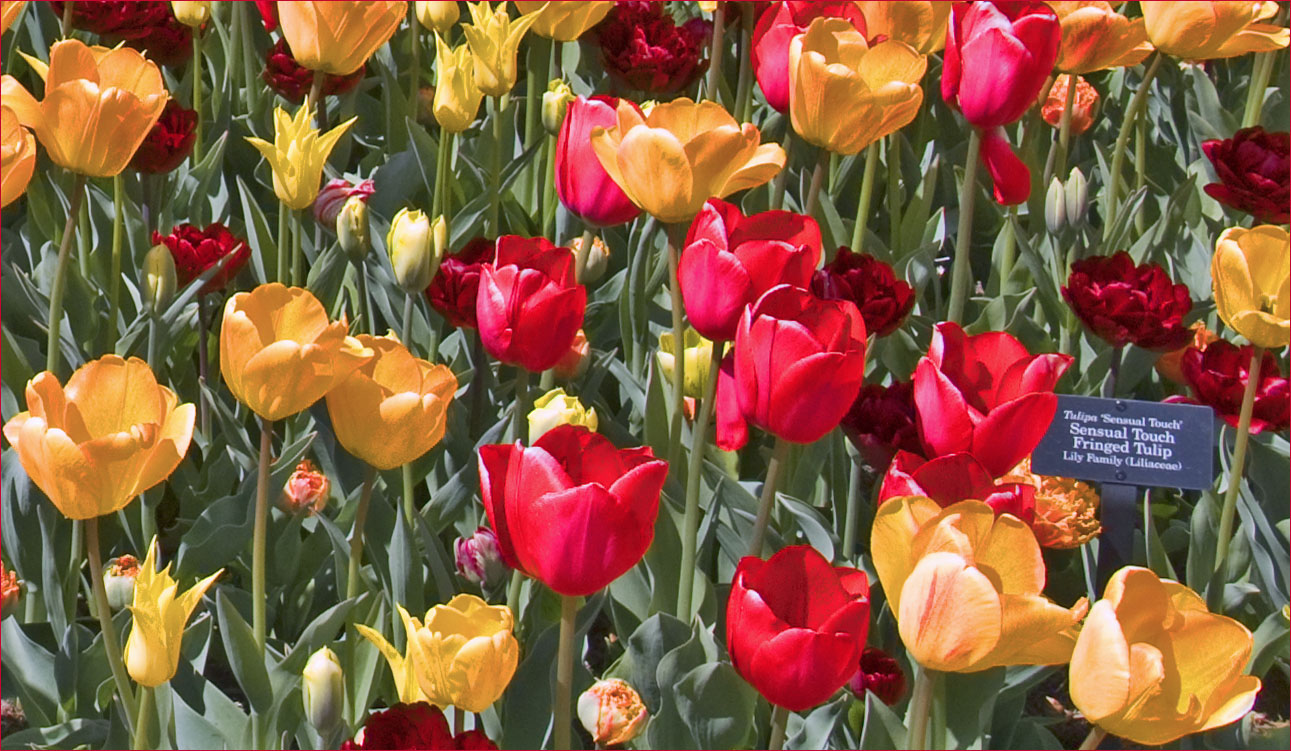
Fringed tulips

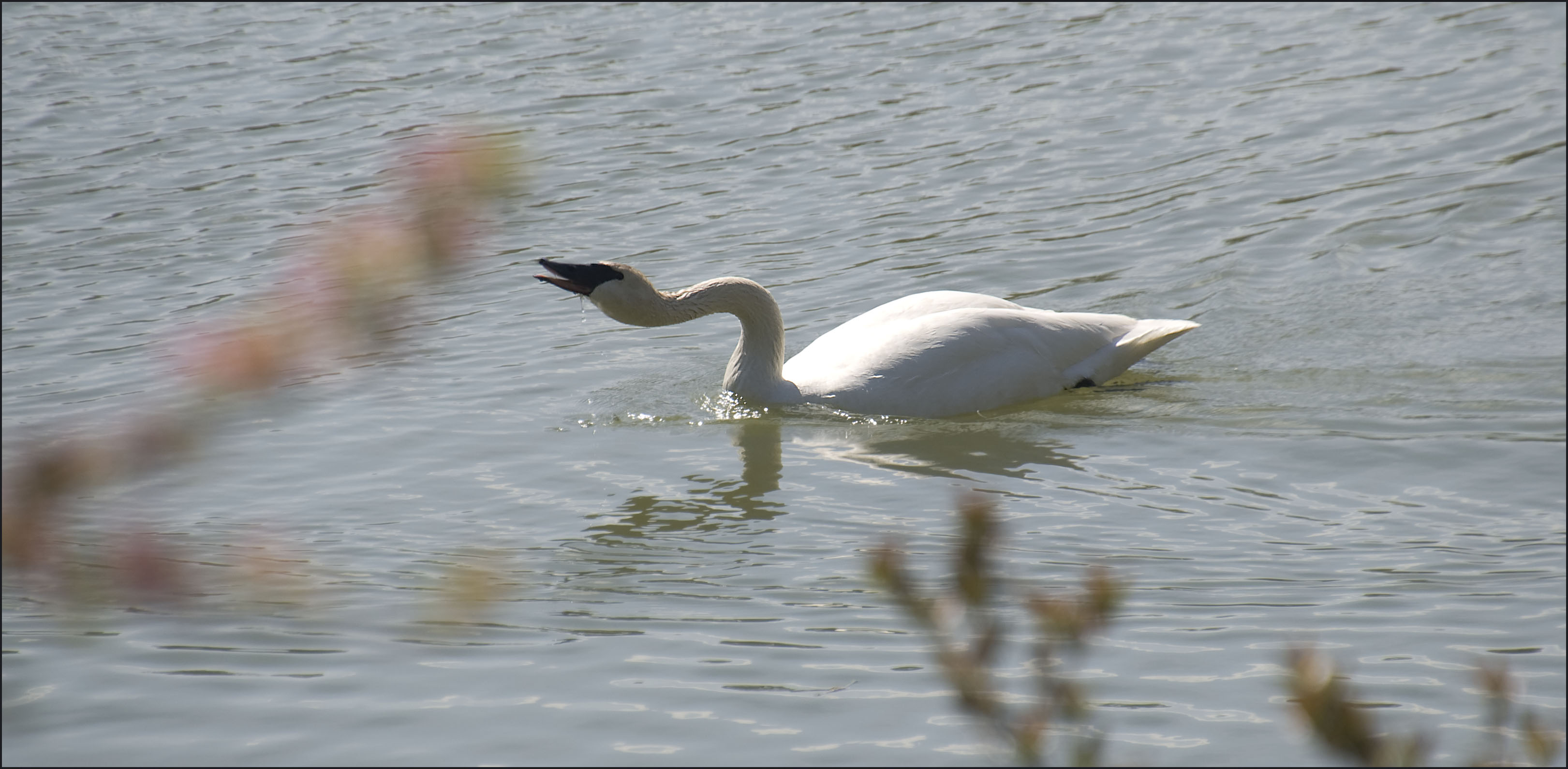
A swan on one of the lakes

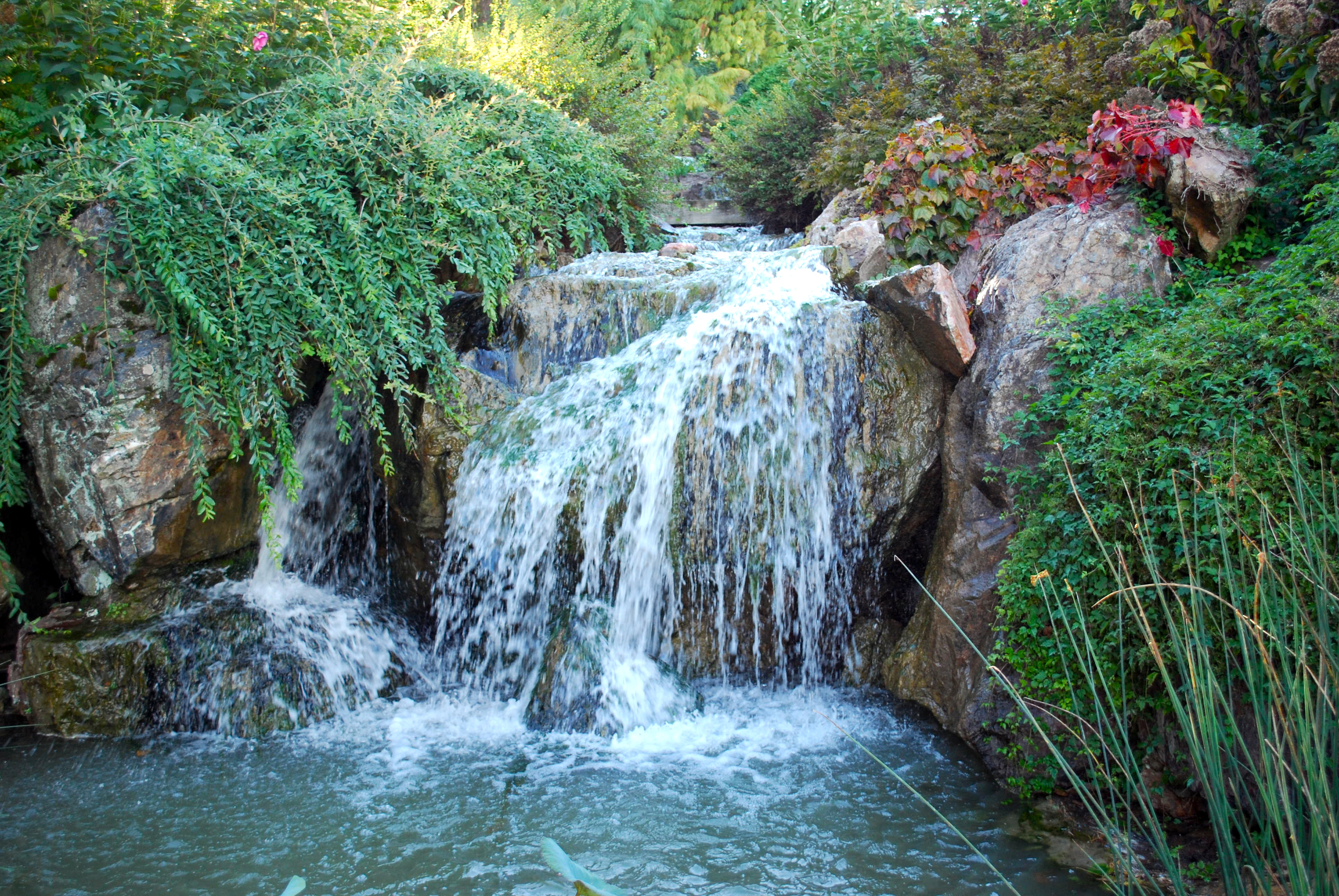
View of a waterfall

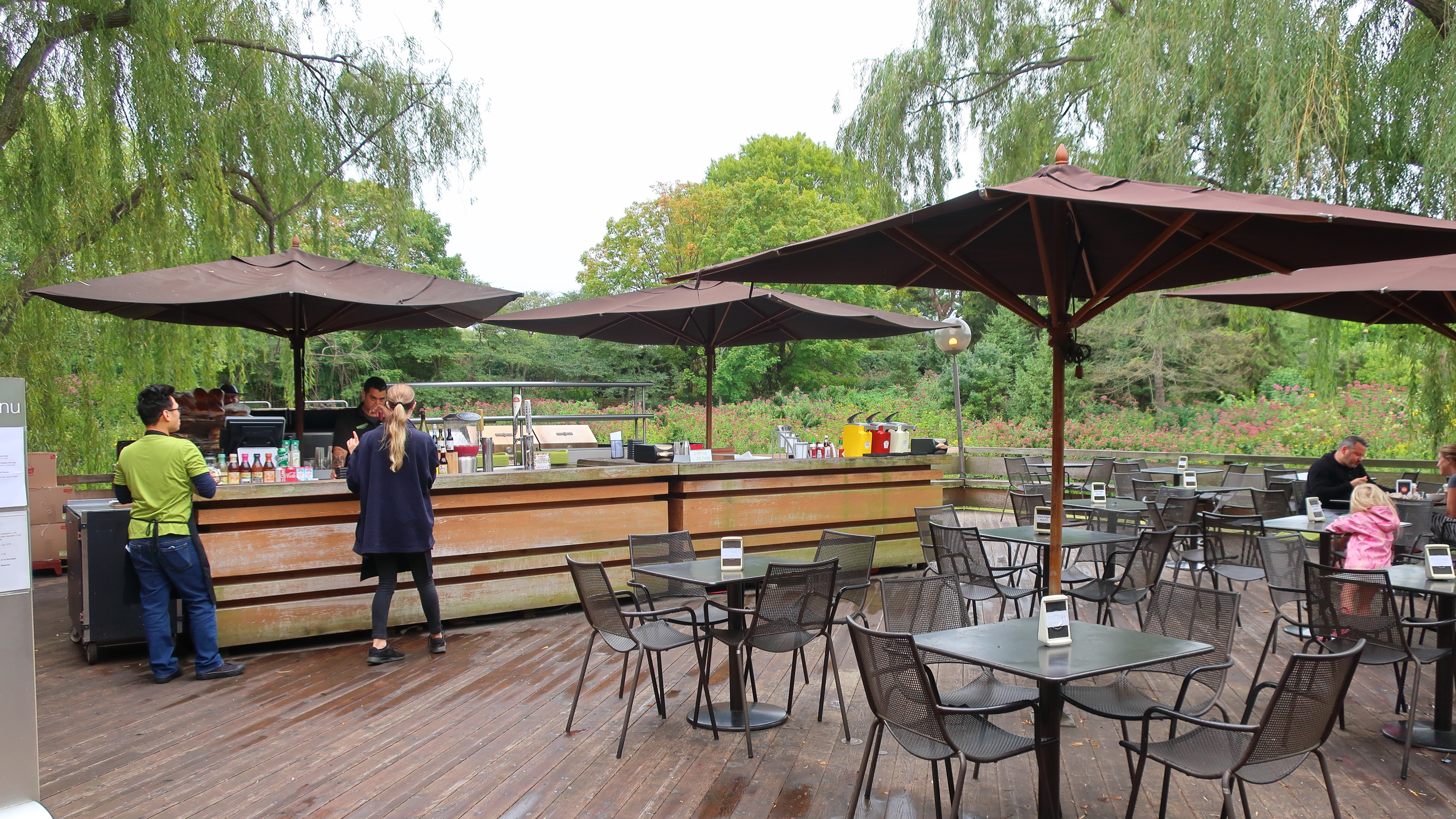
Garden Grille, one of the eateries at the gardens

== See also ==
- American Garden Rose Selections
- List of botanical gardens in the United States
- List of Museums and Cultural Institutions in Chicago
- North American Plant Collections Consortium
