= Joseph Regenstein =

American businessman (1889–1957)

Joseph Regenstein (1889–1957) was an American industrialist whose philanthropy benefited the city of Chicago, especially the University of Chicago, where the Regenstein Library is named in his memory.

As head of Arvey Corp., Regenstein made many innovations in the paper, plastic and chemical fields. In 1931, Regenstein formed a business with his cousin, Julius Hyman, the Velsicol Chemical Corporation that manufactured several chlorinated insecticides including Dieldrin, Aldrin, Chlordane and Heptachlor which were the focus of Rachel Carson's book Silent Spring. Regenstein and Hyman would later fall out when Hyman set up an independent business in Colorado to manufacture insecticides at the Rocky Mountain Arsenal. Numerous lawsuits followed.

Regenstein maintained an intense interest in the development of Chicago and its institutions. To honor him, the Joseph and Helen Regenstein Foundation, on November 9, 1965, gave $10,000,000 toward the new graduate research library at University of Chicago. His son Joseph Regenstein Jr was a life trustee of the university until his death on March 4, 1999, at age 75.

== Literature ==
- Gudrun Azar et al. 'Ins Licht gerückt. Jüdische Lebenswege im Münchner Westen'. München 2008, 159–160, Herbert Utz Verlag, ISBN 978-3-8316-0787-7 (Katalog der gleichnamigen Ausstellung in der Pasinger Fabrik, 10. April bis 25. Mai 2008).

== Link ==
- Theodore Regensteiner
- Regensteiner-Linde in Pasing Helenes Linde Sueddeutsche Zeitung
- Automobilwerk Pasing Siegfried Regensteiner
