= Arthur Sclater =

Irish-born English cricketer

Personal information
- Full name: Arthur William Bassett Sclater
- Born: 27 July 1859; Auburn, County Cavan, Ireland
- Died: 16 June 1882 (aged 22); Titirau River, Otago, New Zealand
- Height: 6 ft 5 in (1.96 m)
- Batting: Right-handed
- Bowling: Right-arm medium

Domestic team information
- Years: Team
- 1879–1880: Sussex

Career statistics
Competition	First-class
Matches	9
Runs scored	107
Batting average	11.88
100s/50s	–/–
Top score	18*
Balls bowled	1,884
Wickets	35
Bowling average	19.62
5 wickets in innings	1
10 wickets in match	1
Best bowling	7/45
Catches/stumpings	12/–
- Source: Cricinfo, 17 June 2012

Arthur William Bassett Sclater (27 July 1859 – 16 June 1882) was an Irish-born English cricketer. Sclater was a right-handed batsman who bowled right-arm medium pace. He was born at Auburn, County Cavan, and was educated at Tunbridge Wells, Kent, and the Royal Agricultural College, Cirencester.

Described as a "young man of grand physique" who stood at "6 feet 5 inches without boots, and proportionately well made", Sclater made his first-class debut for Sussex against Surrey in 1879 at the County Ground, Hove. He made eight further first-class appearances for the county, all in 1880, the last of which came against Hampshire at the Antelope Ground, Southampton. In his nine matches, he scored 107 runs at an average of 11.88, with a high score of 18 not out. With the ball, he took a 35 wickets at a bowling average of 19.62, with best figures of 7/45. This was his only five-wicket haul and came against Surrey at The Oval in 1880, in a match in which he finished with match figures of 10/92.

He later emigrated to New Zealand aboard the SS Manapouri, where he moved in with his cousin, a Mr. E. S. Vernon, who owned a large estate along the Titirau River near Fortrose. On 16 June 1882, Sclater went to shoot ducks on the river, in the company of Miss Josephine Rich, who also lived on the estate of Mr. Vernon. Around noon she departed to make her way back to the house, with Sclater telling her he would follow her home later. The banks of the river were covered in thick undergrowth, and while making his way through it, his breech-loaded gun caught a twig, causing the gun to discharge. The resulting shot hit him in the forehead toward his left eye, the result of which killed him. His body was found the next day in the river by Mr. W. G. Rich and his son. A jury later returned a verdict of accidental death.

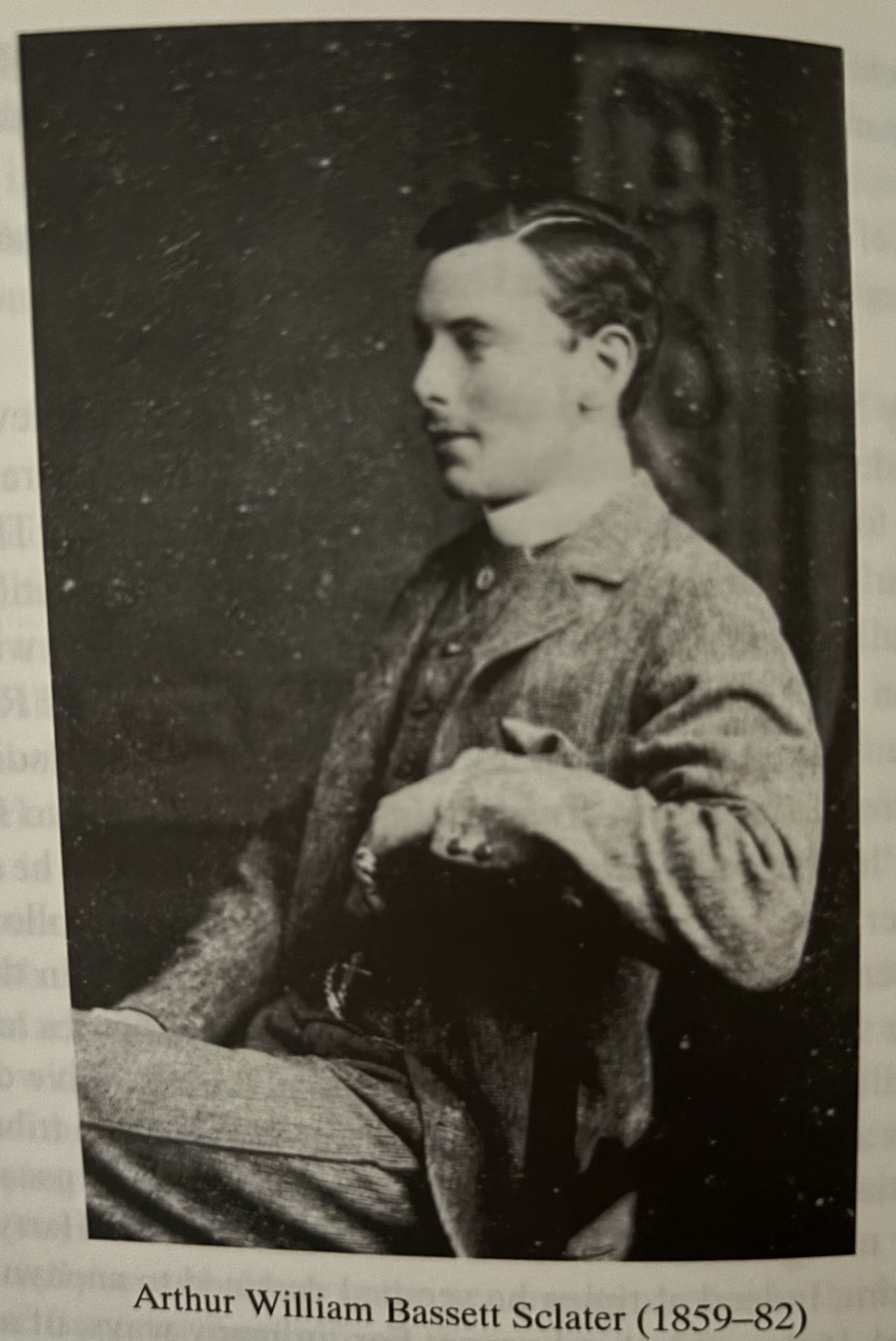
Arthur William Bassett Sclater
