= Sydney Savory Buckman =

British geologist and palaeontologist (1860–1929)

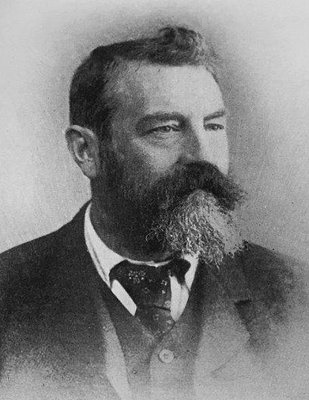
- Sydney Savory Buckman, English palaeontologist and stratigrapher.
- Born: 3 April 1860; Cirencester, England
- Died: 26 February 1929 (aged 68)
- Occupations: Palaeontologist and stratigrapher
- Years active: 1883-1930
- Notable work: A Monograph of the Ammonites of the "Inferior Oolite Series"

Sydney Savory Buckman (3 April 1860, in Cirencester – 26 February 1929) was a British palaeontologist and stratigrapher. He is known for his studies of extinct marine invertebrates, especially the Brachiopoda and Ammonoidea of the Jurassic era (c. 201 – c. 145 Ma (million years ago)).

== Biography ==
Buckman was the eldest son of James Buckman (1814-1884), Professor of Geology, Botany, and Zoology at the Royal Agricultural College 1848-1863, and his wife Julia (1834–1865).

His first scientific paper (which related to Brachiopoda) was published in 1883, in the Proceedings of the Dorsetshire Natural History Field Club.

He was a prolific author. He showed that ammonites could be used as index fossils to subdivide the Jurassic strata. His major work, A Monograph of the Ammonites of the "Inferior Oolite Series" (never really completed), was published in several volumes by the Palaeontographical Society 1887-1907. He described numerous genera and species of marine fossil. During his lifetime, he gained a reputation as a "splitter". His obituary in Nature says that through his studies he "was led to create a multitude of genera and species far beyond what had hitherto been deemed necessary". In 1897 he was awarded the Murchison Fund by the Geological Society.

From 1897 to at least 1899, Sydney and his wife Maude were active in the early modern feminist movement, promoting practical clothing for women through organisations such as the Western Rational Dress Movement and Cycling for Women. He was awarded the Lyell Medal by the Geological Society in 1913.

== Posthumous reputation ==
His reputation as an over-zealous splitter seems to have been justified. As one example, a 1966 analysis of his observations on Sonninia (a genus of ammonite in family Sonniniidae) reduced 70 species down to two. His splitting has been called "extreme". He seems also to have argued on what was, according to the modern scientific consensus, the wrong side of the ontogeny vs. phylogeny debate.

That reputation hindered recognition of his contributions to chronostratigraphy. In 1995, J. H. Callomon acknowledged their significance. In 1996, Peter Doyle wrote, "Buckman's original work involved a high degree of precision in collecting and measurement of stratigraphical sections which demonstrated the potential for the high-resolution scheme he later constructed. Although Buckman's later excesses cast doubt on the accuracy of this work, detailed observations have shown it to be broadly correct and of great importance in long-distance correlation with North America, for example. Clearly, the excesses of Buckman's later theorising have long held back an important contribution to detailed, high-resolution ammonite biostratigraphy". In 1997, H. S. Torrens re-assessed and vindicated Buckman's work.

== Publications ==
Several of his many publications are available online through the University of Pennsylvania.
