= John Scott (agricultural engineer) =

Scottish engineer and inventor

John Scott (c. 1846 – October 1909) was a Scottish consulting agriculturist, agricultural engineer, and pioneer of motorised farming. He is credited with the invention of the tractor power take-off.

== Early life ==
Scott was the son of a farmer in Hawick, Selkirkshire, and as a young man farmed himself. He became Professor of Agriculture at the Royal Agricultural College, Cirencester, in 1880. He resigned his post to investigate ranching, in 1882. In 1877, James Macdonald had reported on American beef-raising for The Scotsman, and the topic had aroused much interest.

== Journalism ==
With John Chalmers Morton, the founding editor of the Agricultural Gazette, Scott wrote The Soil of the Farm (1882), in the "Handbooks of the Farm" Series. He then worked in agricultural journalism, first on the Farmer's Gazette (renamed in 1882), the long-running Dublin journal of W. S. and Edward Purdon. He later moved to the Scottish Agricultural Gazette, which became The Farming World, and was owned by James MacDonald. It was directed towards dairy farmers, and was merged to form The Scottish Farmer.

In 1886, Scott suffered sequestration in bankruptcy proceedings. At the end of 1888, he resigned from The Scottish Farmer to edit Sheep and Wool; its previous editor Charles Scott, his brother, joined the staff of the Melbourne Leader. Sheep and Wool reflected the interests of the trade, had been founded in July 1888 by Charles, and ran to April 1890 in its original form; it was owned by Scott & Co. In October 1888, Scott entered an agreement with Herbert Henry Cooper (died 1891) of Berkhamstead, one of the family of Richard Powell Cooper who inherited William Cooper & Nephews, the sheep dip business, in 1885.

== Motorised farming ==
In 1897, Scott took up development of a motor cultivator, showing one in 1899. The Motor Cultivator Syndicate, of Duddingston, Edinburgh, showed a cultivator in 1900. The Scott Motor Cultivator Ltd. was listed at 12 North St. Andrew Street, Edinburgh in 1903– 1905–6, 1906–7. Scott's Motor Cultivator was illustrated in a 1908 agricultural book.

Scott, in 1903, used a chain and sprocket drive to connect a tractor to other devices, an early example of versatility in this area. In 1904, at Perth a demonstration was held of three practical farming tasks, with a Scott motor and an Ivel motor designed by Dan Albone. In 1905, the Scientific American Supplement carried an article "The Scott Gasoline-Motor-Propelled Agricultural Tractor". Photographs showed a rotary cultivator with a seed drill attached, and the "motor tractor and plowing engine". Power was provided by a 24 hp four-cylinder Aster engine.

== Death ==
Scott died in Hammersmith, in October 1909, aged 63.

== Works ==
- The Land Valuer (1879) and Rents and Purchases (1879): at the time his address was Gloucester Street, in London
- Textbooks Draining and Embanking, Irrigation and Water Supply, Farm Roads, Fences and Gates, Farm Buildings, Barn Implements and Machines (1884), Agricultural Surveying (1884), for Crosby Lockwood and Co.
- The Complete Text-Book of Farm Engineering (1885), omnibus volume
- Blackfaced Sheep: Their History, Distribution, and Improvement, with Methods of Management and Treatment of Their Principal Diseases (1888) with Charles Scott

=== Patents ===
- Rotary plow, US 700247 A
- Rotary cultivator, US 701512 A
