= James Buckman =

James Buckman (20 November 1814 – 23 November 1884) was a British pharmaceutical chemist, professor, museum curator, botanist, geologist, archaeologist, author and farmer.

== Life ==
Buckman was professor of geology, botany, and zoology at the Royal Agricultural College from 1848 to 1863. He founded the university's botanical garden, with which he conducted a number of important botanical experiments, some of which were even mentioned in Darwin's Origin of Species . However, this and other issues caused discord between Buckman and Royal Agricultural College's Principal, the Reverend John Constable. Buckman resigned his position and Constable ordered the botanical gardens to be destroyed.

Buckman developed a variety of parsnip, the "Student" cultivar. There are herbarium specimens collected by James Buckman in the Charterhouse School Herbarium, housed at the University & Jepson Herbaria, University of California, Berkeley.

== Family ==
Buckman married in 1858 married Julia Savory (1834–1865), daughter of John Savory, a pharmacist. They had five children, among them Sydney Savory Buckman.
