= Genovique Specialties Corporation =

- Industry: Chemical industry
- Founded: 2007
- Defunct: 2010
- Successor: Eastman Chemical Company
- Headquarters: Rosemont, Illinois, United States
- Owner: Eastman Chemical Company
- Website: Official website

Genovique Specialties Corporation was a Rosemont, Illinois based chemical company formed in 2005 by Arsenal Capital Partners out of the Velsicol Chemical business unit, which manufactured benzoic acid, sodium benzoate and specialty plasticizers. Its sites included Chestertown, Md., Kohtla-Järve, Estonia, and its joint venture in Wuhan, China.

In 2010 Genovique Specialties was purchased by Eastman Chemical Company.
