= Country Land and Business Association =

Private organisation in England and Wales

CLA
- Formation: 1907
- Legal status: Membership organisation
- Purpose: Represent the interests of landowners and rural business owners
- Headquarters: 16 Belgrave Square, London, SW1X 8PQ
- Location(s): England and Wales
- Members: 33,000 members
- Director General: Isabella Murfin
- Main organ: CLA Council
- Publication: Land and Business
- Website: CLA

The Country Land and Business Association (CLA) is a membership organisation representing landowners, property owners and business owners in England and Wales.

Until 2000, the organisation was known as the Country Landowners Association.

The CLA publishes the monthly Land and Business magazine

== Membership ==
CLA members own or manage 10 million acres, over 50% of the rural land in England and Wales. Its 28,000-strong membership includes landowners, farmers and rural businesses.

== Function ==
The CLA states that it "is the only organisation dedicated to defending your interests as a landowner and is your only truly independent and authoritative source of advice." It offers members a support and advice network through a free in-house policy, legal, and tax advisory service, as well as offering networking opportunities for landowners and rural businesses.

The CLA lobbies to protect its members' interests in relation to rural issues at local, national and EU levels.

== Activities ==
The Policy team, based in the London office, offers advice on tax and legal, environment and conservation, agriculture and land management, as well as planning, housing and heritage. This includes issues such as the right to roam, reform of the EU Common Agricultural Policy, heritage, rural housing, renewable energy and taxation.

Six regional offices include teams of rural surveyors and advisers for local branch members.

== History ==
The Country Landowners’ Association was founded in 1907 in Lincolnshire. As of 1910, the CLA had a membership of 1,000, including 100 Members of Parliament. By 1918, the CLA had 8,000 members.

In 2000, the Country Landowners association changed its name to the Country Land and Business Association starting in 2001. This was done in part to distance the CLA from the perception of representing privileged landed gentry.

The organisation celebrated its centenary in 2007. Journalist Charles Clover wrote The History of the CLA to celebrate the anniversary.

In 2023, OpenDemocracy reported that the CLA had successfully lobbied the government against abolishing the deadline of right to roam claims.

== Structure ==
The CLA is governed by the CLA Council.

There is a small board of directors that is responsible for the running of the CLA.

There is a main corporate office based in London and also five regional offices and one national office (Wales):

- Midlands
- East
- South East
- South West
- Wales
- North

== CLA Game Fair ==
The CLA no longer runs the CLA Game Fair. It announced in September 2015 that it "could no longer ask CLA members to allow their membership subscriptions to underwrite the losses the event makes."

== See also ==
- National Farmers Union (England and Wales)
- Agriculture in the United Kingdom
- Agriculture in Scotland
- Historic Houses Association
- European Landowners' Organisation
- Farmers' Union of Wales
