= Buckman Lake =

Lake in the state of Minnesota, United States

- Location within Minnesota
- Location: Itasca County, Minnesota
- Coordinates: 47°34′23″N 93°24′31″W
- Type: lake
- Surface elevation: 1,358 feet (414 m)

Buckman Lake is a lake in Itasca County, in the U.S. state of Minnesota.

Buckman Lake was named for a lumberman.

== See also ==
- List of lakes in Minnesota
