= Peter Walton (rugby union) =

Scotland international rugby union player

- Born: Peter Walton; 3 June 1969 (age 57) Alnwick, England
- Height: 6 ft 3 in (1.91 m)
- Weight: 109 kg (17 st 2 lb; 240 lb)
- School: Merchiston Castle School; Royal Agricultural College

Rugby union career
- Position: Flanker
Amateur team(s)
Years	Team	Apps	(Points)
1988–1991	Alnwick RFC		
1992	Newcastle Gosforth		
1993–1995	Northampton Saints		
1995–2000	Newcastle Falcons		
International career
Years	Team	Apps	(Points)
1994–1999	Scotland	24	(20)
Coaching career
- Years: Team
- 2000–2008: Newcastle Falcons
- 2008–: England U18 Assistant Coach

Peter Walton (born 3 June 1969) is an English-born rugby union player who won 24 caps playing in the back-row for the Scottish rugby union side between 1994 and 1999, despite uncertainty as to whether he was eligible for Scotland, given a lack of Scottish ancestry. He was educated at Merchiston Castle School, and played club rugby for both Northampton Saints and Newcastle Falcons. At Newcastle he made 15 appearances as they won the 1997-98 Premiership. He was forced to retire due to injury in June 2000. He was assistant coach, Academy Coach and Head for Newcastle Falcons between 2000 and 2008. Since 2008 he has been Assistant Coach with England U18 during which they won three consecutive Grand Slams and had a sequence of 19 victories.

== International selection ==
Under World Rugby rules, the clauses in Regulation 8, Guideline 17 can be taken to pertain to international eligibility in schooling cases.

Regulation 8 on international eligibility is clarified under Guideline 17. The specific 'schooling' clauses state:
For the avoidance of any doubt, seeking to rely on short periods of Residence as a child in a particular country, combined with a short period of Residence in that same country prior to playing for a Union, is likely to create a link that would be too tenuous to satisfy the underlying intentions of establishing a contemporary, permanent, national link with a Union.
However, each case will be assessed on its overall merits to establish if a Player is able to demonstrate a genuine, close, credible and established national link by reference to the amount of time the Player can demonstrate that he has treated the "new" country as his home and other relevant factors.
Walton spent 7 years in Merchiston Castle School in Edinburgh. He played for and captained Scottish Schoolboys in Rugby. However he was initially told that this would not be enough for play for Scotland internationally so then played for England Under 19s. Walton states he felt Scottish and that the English players called him 'Jock'.

He was then selected by Scotland on the basis that his 7 years schooling in Scotland gave him a genuine and credible link to the nation. At the time he was living in England but he was available to capped as the clauses above do not mention immediacy.

The Home Nations have since agreed that 5 years schooling is enough to provide a genuine and credible link to allow international selection in international football and this has been approved by FIFA. World Rugby still assess each case on their individual merits and the demonstration of a genuine, close, credible and established national link is key.
