= European Landowners' Organization =

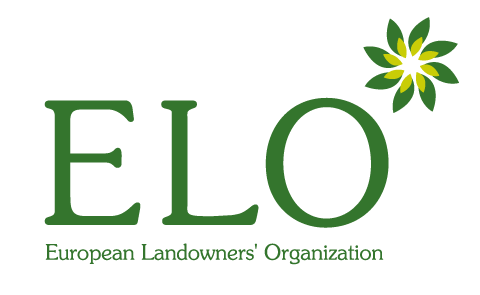
Logo ELO

The European Landowners' Organization (ELO) is a non-profit organization representing the interests of the owners and managers of rural land, and rural businesses, within the EU. The secretariat is based in Brussels.

== History ==
The member-based organization was created in 1972, when the United Kingdom was joining the European Economic Community, as a European extension of the British Country Landowners' Association.

== Purpose ==
The European Landowners' Organization (ELO) is a Brussels-based interest group representing landowners, land managers and rural entrepreneurs at the European level. It has more than 50 member organisations from across Europe and seeks to influence European Union policies affecting agriculture, forestry, biodiversity, climate, rural development and property rights. ELO is registered in the EU Transparency Register as an organisation engaged in activities intended to influence EU policy and decision-making. According to its registration, its activities include direct contacts with EU institutions, participation in expert groups and consultations, policy events, and advocacy on behalf of its members.

ELO states that its objective is to promote "a prosperous and attractive European countryside", with a focus on sustainable land management, private property rights and economically viable rural businesses. It develops policy positions through consultation with its members and engagement with European, national and international stakeholders. ELO participates in consultative committees and working groups on issues including agriculture, forestry, environment, biodiversity, climate policy, renewable energy, innovation, rural development and trade.

In 2008 ELO founded with the Syngenta the Forum for the Future of Agriculture a joint platform to boost the voice of the various stakeholders of the food value chain.

== Controversies ==
Current ELO Secretary General Jurgen Tack became the subject of media scrutiny in Flanders in 2015, when he was Secretary-General of the Flemish Research Foundation (FWO) after investigative reports alleged that a management award listed on his curriculum vitae had been obtained through a fictitious organization and that the associated prize had been purchased by Tack himself prior to the award ceremony. The controversy, widely covered by Flemish media, prompted an internal investigation, criticism from academics, and calls for his resignation. In January 2016, Tack stepped down as Secretary-General by mutual agreement with the organization.
