= Royal Agricultural University =

Agricultural university in Cirencester, England

- Coat of arms
- Motto: Latin: Arvorum Cultus Pecorumque (from Virgil's Georgics)
- Motto in English: Caring for the Fields and the Beasts
- Type: Public
- Established: 2013 (13 years ago) – university status 1845 (181 years ago) – college
- President: Charles III
- Vice-Chancellor: Peter McCaffery
- Students: 925 (2024/25)
- Undergraduates: 760 (2024/25)
- Postgraduates: 165 (2024/25)
- Location: Cirencester, Gloucestershire, England; 51°32′35″N 1°59′42″W
- Campus: Rural
Colours
- Website: rau.ac.uk

The Royal Agricultural University (RAU), formerly the Royal Agricultural College, is a public university in Cirencester, Gloucestershire, England. Established in 1845, it was the first agricultural college in the English-speaking world.

== History ==
The Royal Agricultural University was founded as the Royal Agricultural College in 1842, at a meeting of the Fairford and Cirencester Farmers' Club. Concerned by the lack of government support for education, Robert Jeffreys-Brown addressed the meeting on "The Advantages of a Specific Education for Agricultural Pursuits". A prospectus was circulated, a general committee was appointed and Henry Bathurst, 4th Earl Bathurst was elected president. Funds were raised by public subscription: much of the support came from the wealthy landowners and farmers of the day, and there was no government support. Construction of the main building, in Victorian Tudor style, began in April 1845 and was designed by S. W. Daukes and John R. Hamilton, and built by Thomas Bridges of Cirencester. The first 25 students were admitted to the college in September 1845.

Queen Victoria granted a royal charter to the college in 1845 and sovereigns have been patrons ever since, visiting the college in every reign. King Charles III became president in 1982 when he was Prince of Wales. The college gained full university status in 2013 and changed its name accordingly. It had 1,125 students in the 2024/25 academic year and saw a 49% rise in applications between 2008 and 2013. In 2021 the RAU expanded with the creation of a Cultural Heritage Institute based in Swindon.

== Rankings ==
Rankings
National rankings
- Complete (2027): 119
- Times / Sunday Times (2027): 130

The RAU ranked in the top 10 universities in the UK for the best student experience and was the highest-ranking university in Gloucestershire, according to the Sunday Times Good University Guide 2023. It was shortlisted in the Small or Specialist category in the Whatuni Student Choice Awards 2024. The RAU debuted in the Times Higher Education (THE) University Impact Rankings 2024 in the top 200 globally for Zero Hunger (Goal 2) – coming in at joint 15th for UK universities and joint 12th for an English University. While, for the Life on Land Goal (Goal 15), the RAU was in the top 300 globally and joint 38th for a UK university. The university ranked in the top 10 nationally for the Land and Property Management subject area in the Complete University Guide 2025.

== Farms ==
The university operates two farms close to the campus:

- Coates Manor Farm is predominantly arable cropped with some pasture land.
- Fossehill Farm provides polo and hunter livery stabling and associated exercise facilities.

Harnhill Manor Farm was purchased in 2009 and with Coates Manor Farm totals 491 hectares (1,210 acres) of land. The farm was managed organically for many years but all the land apart from the outdoor-pig unit was taken out of organic management. In 2011, an old sheep shed at the front of the farm complex was turned into the 'John Oldacre Rural Innovation Centre' a building designed for the training of students and members of the public in vocational skills such as rough-terrain forklift truck driving, blacksmithing, chainsaw and welding course, etc. The building cost £1.2 million to transform. The JORIC was officially opened in March 2014 by Sir John Beddington and the site was visited in November 2013 by Prince Charles.

== Sport ==
The university has a range of sports facilities on campus, including a gym, an all-weather pitch, and squash and tennis courts. Students participate in a wide range of sports including; clay pigeon shooting, cricket, equestrian, field sports (hunting, fishing and shooting), football, golf, lacrosse, hockey, netball, polo, rugby, rifle shooting, rowing, tennis and yachting.

The Royal Agricultural University is just one of three remaining British universities (the others being the University of Cambridge and the University of Oxford) to maintain their own beagle pack. Founded in 1889, the RAU Beagles is run by the students who whip in and hunt the hounds, and until the 2004 hunting ban, hunted hares in the countryside around Cirencester.

== Research ==
In the Research Excellence Framework (REF) 2021, 52% of the university's research was classed as 3* or 4* meaning it is world-leading or internationally excellent. In addition, half of the university's scientific publications were deemed to be of international quality. In Research England's Knowledge Exchange Framework, the university was grouped into the STEM cluster – small specialist universities in medicine, science, and engineering – ranking second out of the nine institutions in the cluster. The university was recognised as having very high or high engagement in five of the seven criteria on which it was judged.

== Library ==
The university library holds around 40,000 print volumes, nearly 1,000 current journal subscriptions, more than 40,000 e-books and a growing number of full-text databases. The main collection is supplemented by a support collection and a historical collection of texts, primarily on agriculture and estate/land management, dating back to the 16th century. The library also holds the RAU archive, a collection of documents relating to the institution since its foundation.

== Controversies ==
In April 2023, the university was criticised by animal rights activists after students tied a dead fox to the roof of a car during a charity event. The university launched an investigation and issued a range of sanctions relating to the incident that included permanent expulsion.

Similarly, on 29 March 2023 it was reported by Channel 4 News that the Royal Agricultural College Beagles were allegedly hare-coursing - an act that has been illegal since 2005.

== Patrons ==
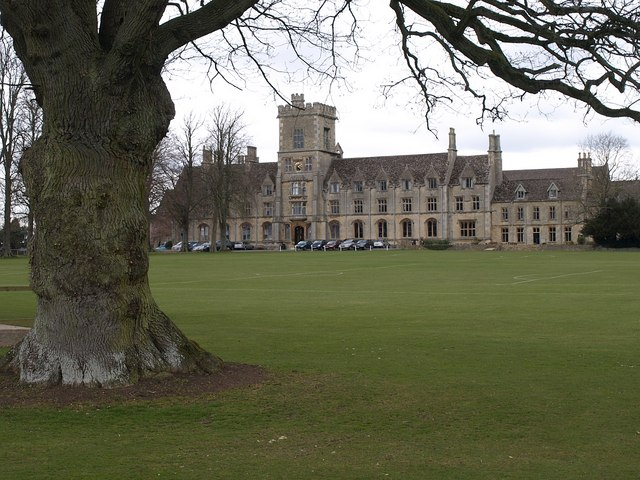
RAU campus in Cirencester

The patron of RAU and its predecessor institution, the Royal Agricultural College, has always been the reigning British monarch. The gap between Queen Elizabeth II and King Charles III occurred because of a review of royal patronages.

- 1845–1901 – Queen Victoria
- 1901–1910 – King Edward VII
- 1910–1936 – King George V
- 1936 – King Edward VIII
- 1936–1952 – King George VI
- 1952–2022 – Queen Elizabeth II
- 2024 – present – King Charles III

== Notable people ==
=== Staff ===
- James Buckman – professor of geology, botany, and zoology from 1848 to 1863
- John D. Custance – professor of agricultural science in the late 1870s, later was responsible for establishing Roseworthy Agricultural College in South Australia
- John Scott – on the staff shortly from 1880, later became known as a tractor pioneer
- Sir Emrys Jones – former chief adviser to the Minister of Agriculture from 1967 to 1973, and director of the Government's Agricultural and Development Advisory Service (ADAS), was principal of the college from 1973 until 1978. He described his time at Cirencester as the most enjoyable period in his life. In 2011, a new teaching facility at the college was named in his honour. For university applicants with a connection to Wales, a scholarship has been set up that carries the former principal's name.
- Edward William Prevost – professor of chemistry from 1879 to 1881; then retired to be a farmer
- George Stephen West (1876–1919) – professor of natural history from 1899 to 1906
- John Wrightson (1840–1916) – founder of Downton Agricultural College
- Mark Horton – pro vice-chancellor, Research & Enterprise from 2021
- Cassie Newland, senior lecturer in cultural heritage, director of the Cultural Heritage Institute

=== Alumni ===
Notable students from the institution include:

Arts and Media

- Mark Bence-Jones, writer
- Jonathan Dimbleby, television personality and political commentator
- Dwijendralal Ray Bengali poet
- Teddy McDonald, contemporary artist

Peerage

- Sir John Agnew, 6th Baronet
- David Brudenell-Bruce, 9th Marquess of Ailesbury
- Sir Euan Anstruther-Gough-Calthorpe, 3rd Baronet
- Derek Barber, Baron Barber of Tewkesbury
- Alan Brooke, 3rd Viscount Brookeborough
- Jeremy Browne, 11th Marquess of Sligo
- Torquhil Campbell, 13th Duke of Argyll
- Robin Cayzer, 3rd Baron Rotherwick, one of the 92 hereditary peers elected to remain in the House of Lords
- Sir Thomas Chapman, 7th Baronet
- Patrick Chichester, 8th Marquess of Donegall
- David Cunliffe-Lister, 2nd Earl of Swinton
- Robin Dundas, Earl of Ronaldshay
- Francis Egerton, 7th Duke of Sutherland
- Nicholas Guy Halsey
- James Hamilton, 5th Duke of Abercorn
- Gustavus Hamilton-Russell, 10th Viscount Boyne
- Lord Nicholas Hervey
- Charles Kennedy, 5th Marquess of Ailsa
- Prince Jonah Kuhio Kalanianaole of Hawaii
- John Lowry-Corry, 8th Earl Belmore
- John Lyttelton, 11th Viscount Cobham
- David Ogilvy, 13th Earl of Airlie
- William Peel, 3rd Earl Peel
- Eric Saumarez, 7th Baron de Saumarez
- Malcolm Sinclair, 20th Earl of Caithness
- Henry Somerset, 12th Duke of Beaufort
- FitzRoy Somerset, 5th Baron Raglan
- John Spencer, 8th Earl Spencer, father of Diana, Princess of Wales
- James Spencer-Churchill, 12th Duke of Marlborough
- Patrick Stopford, 9th Earl of Courtown
- Luke White, 6th Baron Annaly
- Sir John Wills, 4th Baronet

Politics

- Stuart Agnew, UK Independence Party MEP
- Richard Benyon, Member of Parliament
- William Bridges-Maxwell, Australian politician
- Sandy Bruce-Lockhart
- Julian Cayo-Evans
- Michael Colvin, former Member of Parliament
- Simon Coveney, former Tánaiste, Minister for Foreign Affairs and Trade and Deputy Leader of Fine Gael
- Richard Drax, Member of Parliament
- Simon Hart, Baron Hart of Tenby, peer, former MP for Carmarthen West and South Pembrokeshire
- Tim Johnston, Manx politician
- Timothy Kitson, former MP
- Roger Knapman, former leader of UKIP
- Arthur Nichols, Australian politician
- Joseph-Xavier Perrault
- Henry Plumb, Baron Plumb, former chairman of the NFU and politician
- James Provan, former MEP
- Edward Cephas John Stevens
- Noel Stirling Austin Arnold Wallinger

Sports

- Algernon Bligh. Somerset County cricketer
- Mark Anthony Peter Phillips, former husband of the Princess Royal, Great Britain equestrian rider, cross country course designer
- Jason Little, Australian rugby union player
- Ben Clarke, England, British Lions and Bath rugby union player
- Tim Payne, England, British Lions and Wasps rugby union player
- Peter Walton, Scotland, British Lions and Newcastle rugby union player
- Marcus Armytage, National Hunt jockey
- Henry Cecil, race horse trainer
- Aubrey Jackman, tattooist
- Nigel Gadsby, England cricketer
- Arthur Sclater, Sussex County cricketer
- Richard Nancekivell, Cornwall and Northampton Saints rugby union player
- John Pullin, England, British Lions and Bristol rugby union Player
- Andrew Balding, racehorse trainer
- Nicky Henderson, racehorse trainer
- Lisa Wooding, England and Great Britain hockey player, Olympian
- Mike Tucker, equestrian and agricultural show commentator

Other

- Richard Abel Smith
- James Buckman
- Charlotte Clark
- Michael Coulson (barrister)
- Tim Heywood
- Chris Keeble, soldier, The Parachute Regiment and Harris Manchester College, University of Oxford
- Eleanor Anne Ormerod
- Edward Packard, son of the founder of Fisons fertiliser
- Baron Rathcreedan, pedigree cow auctioneer
- Sir Wilfred de Soysa
- Augustus Voelcker, professor of agricultural chemistry
- John Wrightson, founder of Downton Agricultural College
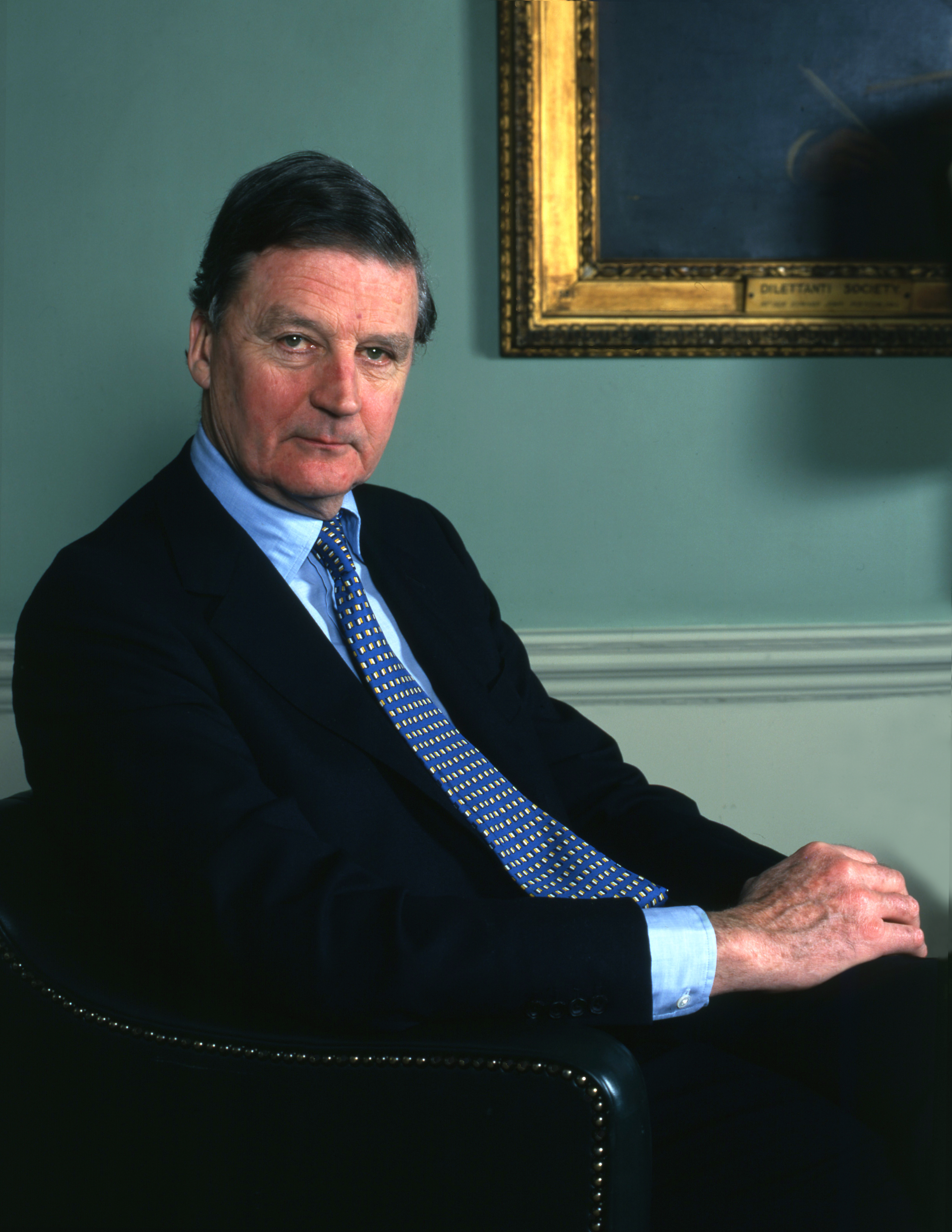
James Hamilton, 5th Duke of Abercorn

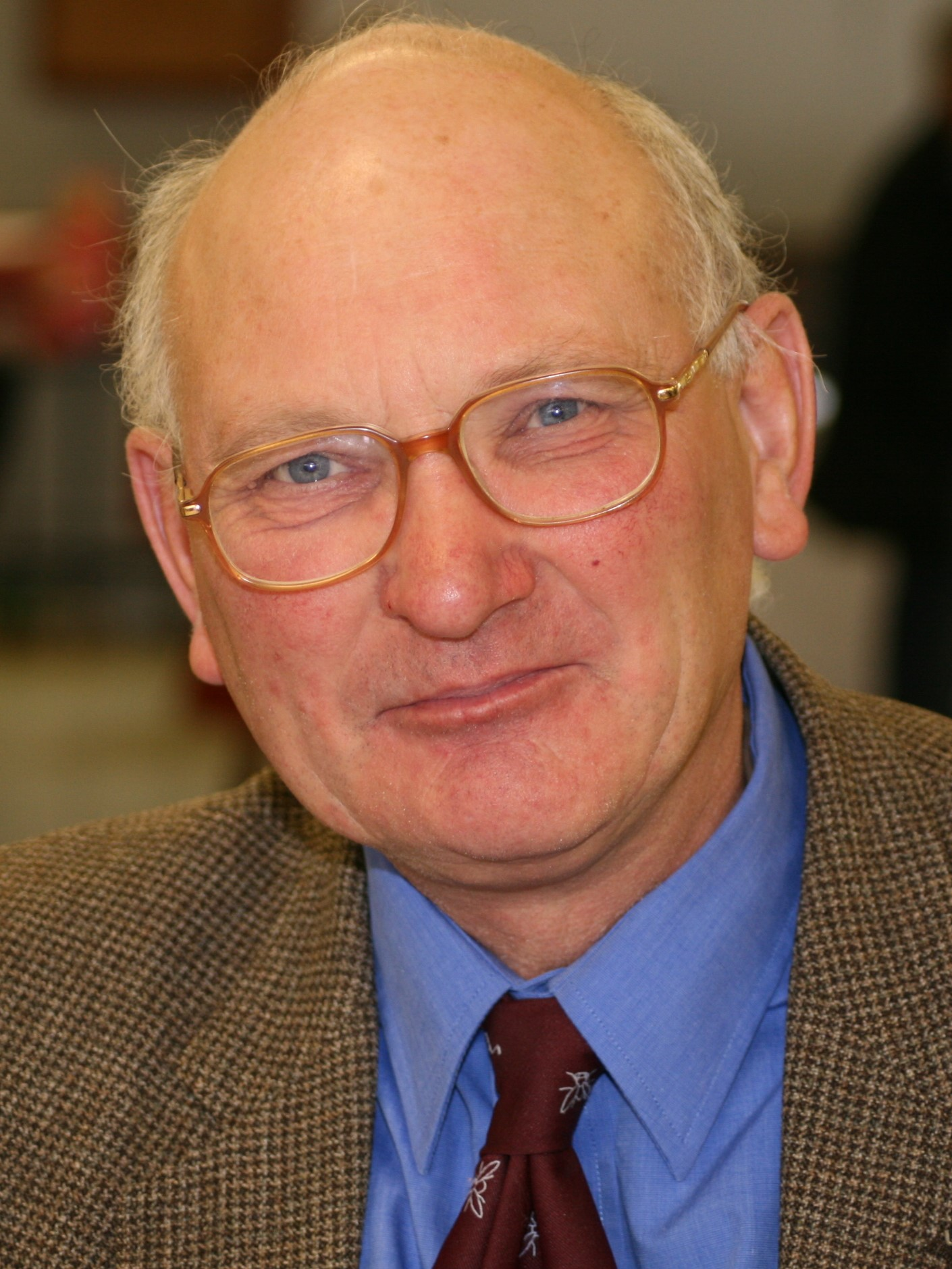
UKIP MEP Stuart Agnew

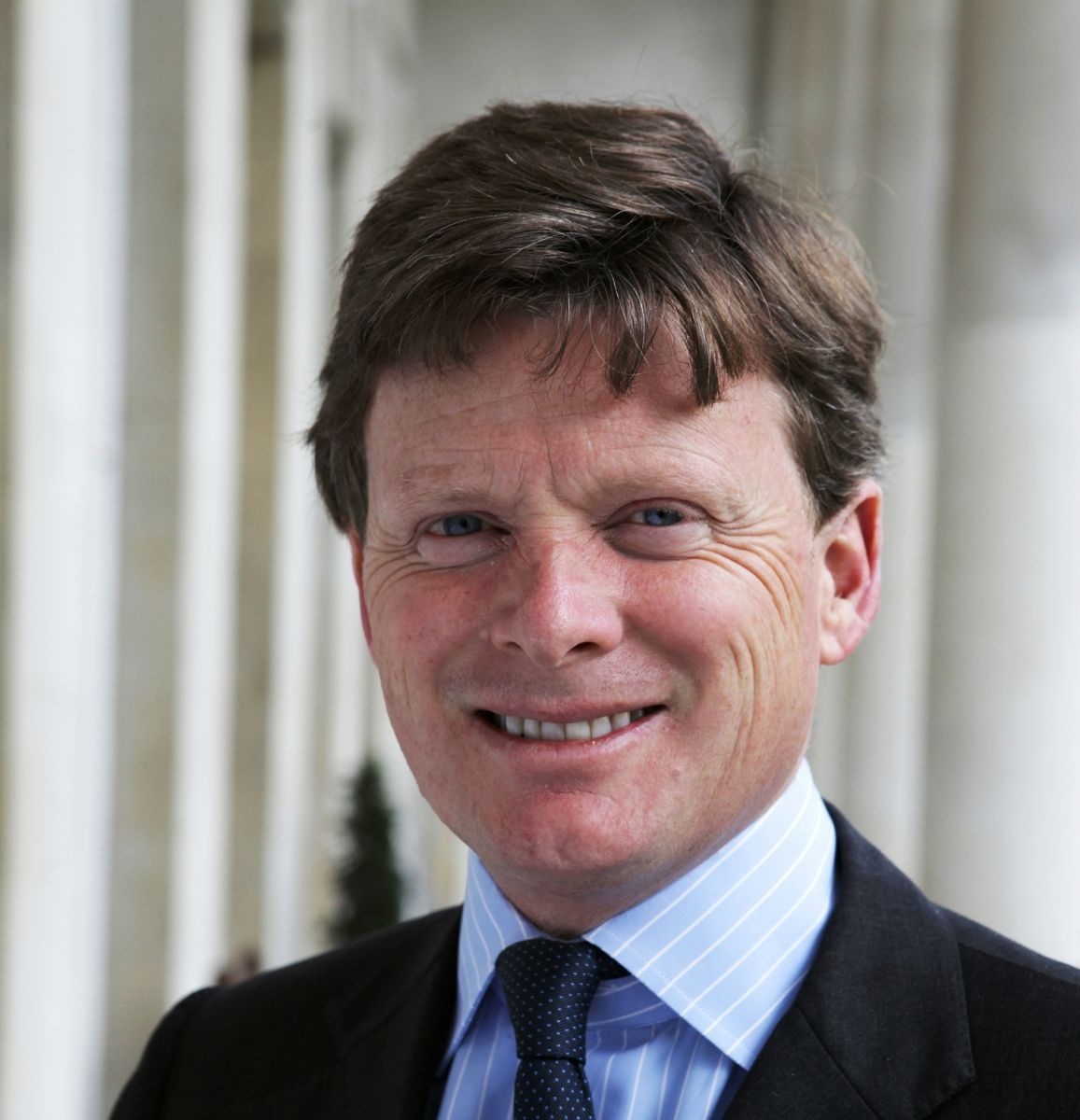
Conservative MP Richard Benyon

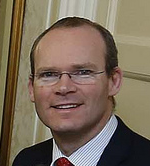
Irish Cabinet Minister Simon Coveney

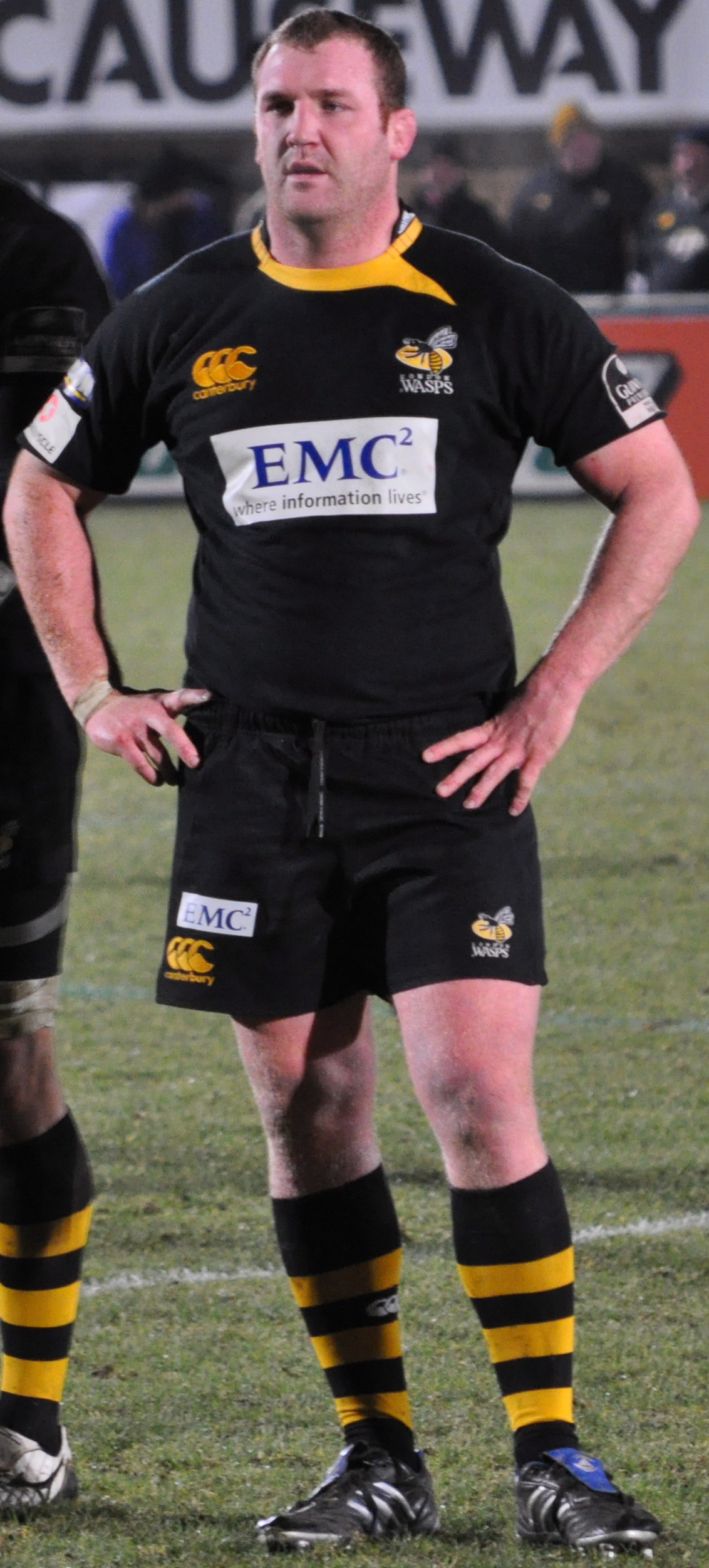
England Rugby player Tim Payne
