= Regenstein Library =

Main library of the University of Chicago

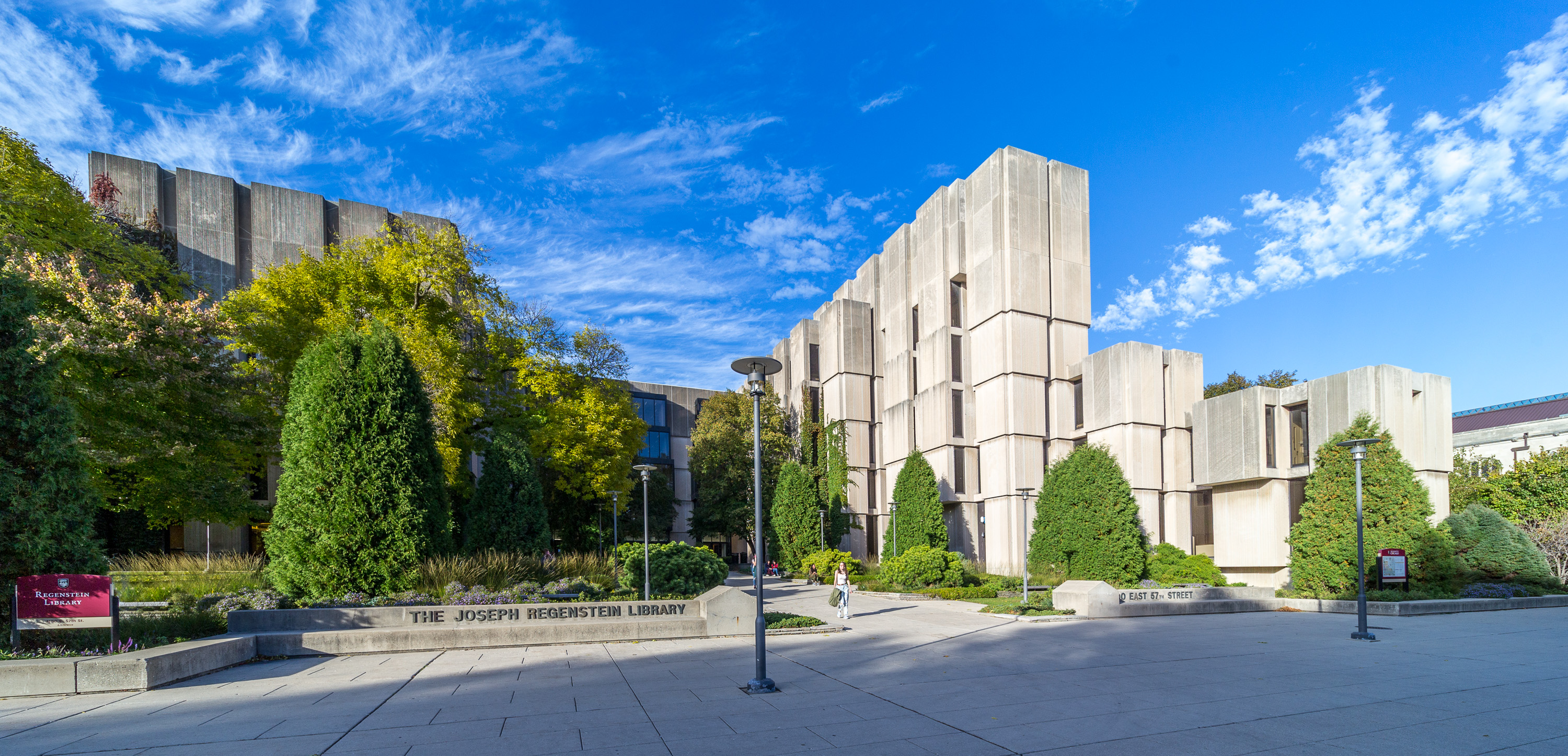
- Main approach to Regenstein Library
- 41°47′32″N 87°35′59″W
- Location: Hyde Park, Chicago, United States
- Type: Academic library
- Established: 1970
- Branch of: University of Chicago Library

Collection
- Items collected: books, journals, newspapers, magazines, sound and music recordings, maps, prints, drawings and manuscripts
- Size: 4.5 million

Access and use
- Members: 33,000

Other information
- Director: Torsten Reimer
- Website: lib.uchicago.edu

The Joseph Regenstein Library (/ˈreɪɡənstaɪn/ RAY-gən-styne), colloquially The Reg, is the primary library of the University of Chicago. Part of the University of Chicago Library system, it is located on the university’s Hyde Park campus on the South Side of Chicago. Named after the industrialist and philanthropist Joseph Regenstein, it is one of the largest repositories of books in the world. The Regenstein is noted for its brutalist architecture.

== History ==
The library stands on the former grounds of Stagg Field.

Herman H. Fussler, director of libraries from 1948-1971, was central to its planning.

In 1965, the Joseph and Helen Regenstein Foundation donated $10 million to the University for construction of the library. In 1968, the university broke ground, and in 1970 the library opened at the final cost of $20,750,000. The building was designed by the Chicago firm Skidmore, Owings & Merrill, led by senior architect Walter Netsch. It is built out of grooved limestone, which, from a distance, resembles concrete. University tour guides often remark on the resemblance between each element of the building's facade and the fore edge of a book.

The University of Chicago Graduate Library School was housed in the Joseph Regenstein Library until its closure. Today, the "Reg" is the flagship institution of the University of Chicago Library system, which is considered among the top five in the world for breadth and depth of material, and receives high marks from users (The Princeton Review placed it in the top nine for college students).

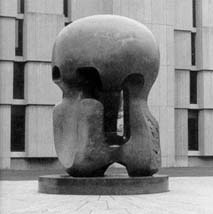
The Regenstein Library was constructed on the former site of Alonzo Stagg Field where the first controlled, self-sustaining, nuclear chain reaction took place on December 2, 1942. Henry Moore's bronze sculpture Nuclear Energy commemorates the event.

The building has five floors above ground and two basements. Each floor has a large reading room in the center with desks, group study rooms, lockers and shelved reference works. The reading rooms on floors two and three are connected by a small atrium. The reading rooms are separated from the stacks, located on the west side of the building, so that the stacks can be maintained at lower temperatures, which are more amicable to book conservation. Two hundred and twenty faculty studies line the east side of the building.

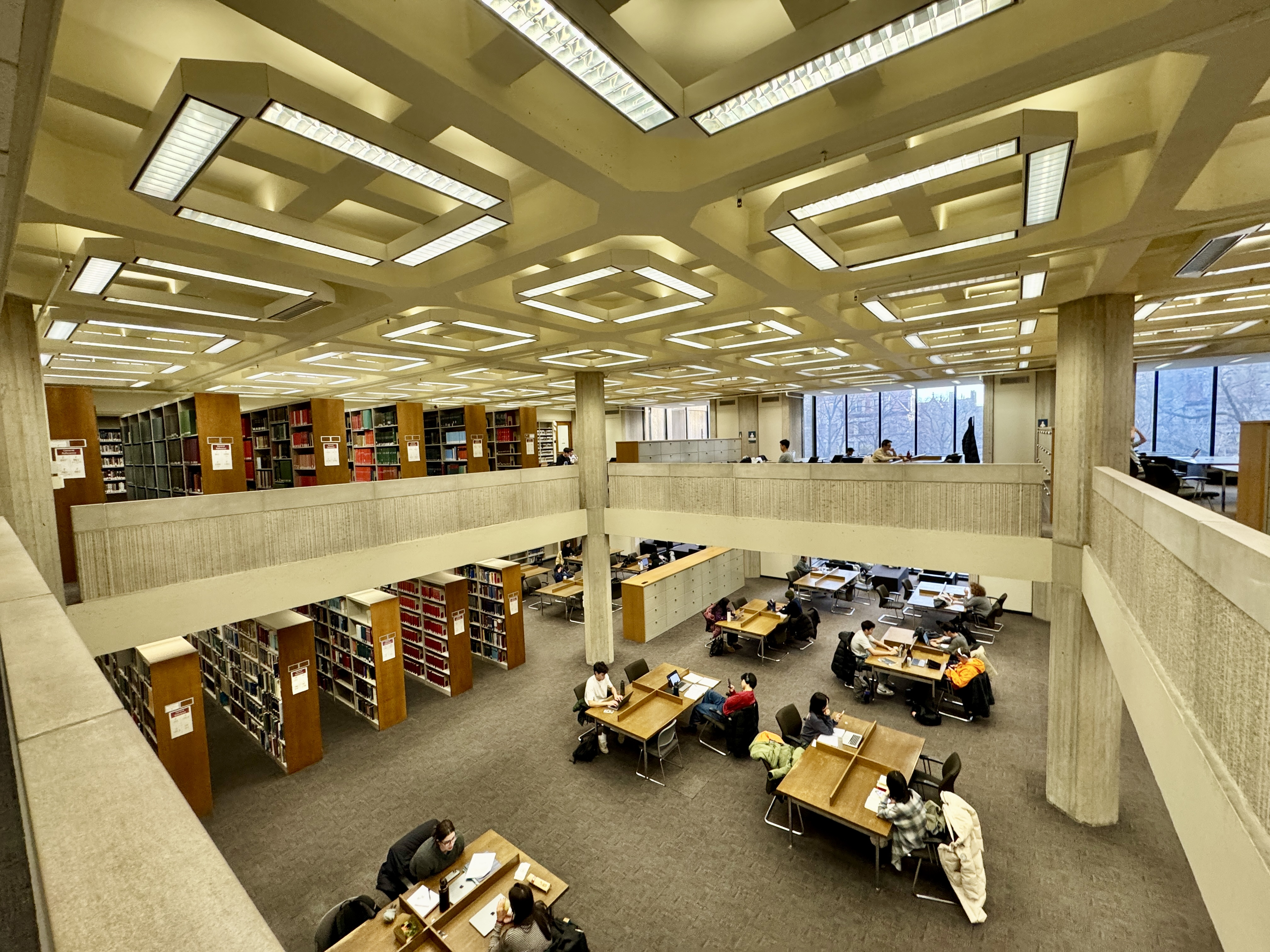
Interior

The Regenstein's overflowing collection posed space problems for the book stacks. In May 2005, the University of Chicago's Board of Trustees authorized funding for a $42 million addition to the library, which was completed mid-2011. The Joe and Rika Mansueto Library, designed by Chicago-based architect Helmut Jahn, consists of a glass-domed reading room, under which lies an automated storage and retrieval system stretching fifty feet underground. It allows the library to maintain physical copies of materials available online while creating space within the book stacks to accommodate approximately 20 years of new print acquisitions.

The Regenstein Library is a popular social space for University of Chicago college students: "On our campus, it's not the football game that draws the biggest crowd, it's evening study in the library," said former Provost Richard Saller. "We're a campus where the library is sort of the social center because it is the focus [of the university]."

The Regenstein Library is also the location of the Hanna Holborn Gray Special Collections Research Center, which houses rare book collections, manuscripts, and university archives. The SCRC was established in 1953 by Herman H. Fussler and was moved to the "Reg" when it opened in 1970. As of May 2025, the rare books collection currently holds approximately 350,000 volumes.

== Figures ==
- Area: 577,085 gross feet^{2}.
- Maximum east-west dimension: 344'.
- Maximum north-south dimension: 411'6".
