= Buckman (company) =

Company in Tennessee, United States

Buckman is a privately held, ISO-certified, global specialty chemical company headquartered in Memphis, Tennessee, US. The company conducts business in over 90 countries, operates out of ten global locations – Memphis, Tennessee; Cadet, Missouri; Canada, Europe, Mexico, Brazil, Australia, South Africa, Singapore, and China – and employs approximately 1700 associates. Core industries are pulp and paper, leather, water treatment and process chemistry. Secondary industries include performance chemicals (paint, coatings, plastics, water formulators, wood treatment, and agriculture).

== History ==
Buckman Laboratories was founded in 1945 in Memphis, Tennessee, US, by Dr. Stanley J. Buckman to mitigate microbial problems in the pulp and paper industry. The company was established on the site of an old lumberyard. One 55-gallon reactor was employed for the company's first product, BSM-11. In 1948, Buckman Laboratories of Canada was established as a warehouse and marketing company. During the 1950s, the company developed a number of biocides for the leather, sugar, and paint industries.

In the 1960s, it developed two new fungicides. During this decade, it also developed products for bacterial and algae control in swimming pools, cooling water systems, and fresh water. In addition to the Memphis plant, a new manufacturing facility was built in Cadet, Missouri, USA, in 1963 on 4,500 acres originally acquired for the mining of barite ore. It also formed branches in Mexico in 1963 and in Belgium in 1964.

In the 1970s, new companies were formed in South Africa, Australia, and Brazil.

When founder Dr. Stanley J. Buckman died in 1978, leadership passed to his son Robert H. Buckman, who became CEO.

In 1987, the company was restructured as Bulab Holdings, with Buckman Laboratories International, Inc. serving as the managing company over the corporation's subsidiaries. Robert's cousin, Steven B. Buckman, was elected president and chief operating officer of Buckman Laboratories International, Inc.

In the 1980s and 1990s, Robert H. Buckman pushed for greater global communications within the company to enhance business operations. He recounted these efforts in a book he wrote entitled “Building a Knowledge-Driven Organization”.

In 1991, two new companies were created in New Zealand and Singapore.

In 1996, Steven B. Buckman became chairman of the board, chief executive officer, and chief operating officer.

In April 2000, Robert H. Buckman retired and Steven B. Buckman was elected president of Bulab Holdings. Robert's daughter, Katherine Buckman Gibson, was elected chairman of the board. To support future growth in Asia, Buckman founded a company in Shanghai, China, in 2000.

The following year, in 2001, Buckman acquired the Eclipse Chemical Company, a purchase that at the time placed Buckman as the third largest water treatment company in Canada.

In 2004, all Buckman manufacturing facilities had achieved ISO 14001 certification. Buckman received the US EPA Presidential Green Chemistry Award for enzymatic stickies control in recycled papers.

In 2005, Buckman was named 2004 Supplier of the Year by National Gypsum Corporation.

In 2009, Buckman updated its identity and brand by dropping the Laboratories from the company logo and external communications. The company is now known simply as Buckman. New products and programs were introduced during the year. The eco-friendly biocide Oxamine® was launched in the water treatment market, and a new metals management program and Medallion Right Size for smaller mills were novel offerings to the pulp and paper market.

In 2012, Buckman was awarded the EPA's Presidential Green Chemistry Challenge Award (Designing Greener Chemicals Award category) for their Maximyze® enzymes to reduce energy and decrease the amount of wood fiber needed to manufacture high quality paper.

In 2014, Kathy Buckman Gibson was named president and chief operating officer for Buckman International, and Otto Heissenberger Jr. assumed her chairman of the board role.

In 2017, Steven B. Buckman retired and Junai Maharaj became president and CEO. Junai Maharaj previously served as the managing director of Buckman Europe, Middle East and North Africa as well as general manager of Buckman South Africa. Otto Heissenberger Jr. retired as chairman of the board and Kathy Buckman Gibson was named as the new chairman.

== Locations ==
- Buckman International - Memphis, Tennessee, USA
- Buckman Asia - Singapore
- Buckman Australia/New Zealand - Wagga Wagga, Australia
- Buckman Brazil - Campinas, São Paulo, Brazil
- Buckman China - Shanghai, China
- Buckman Europe - Ghent, Belgium
- Buckman India - Chennai, India
- Buckman Japan - Tokyo, Japan
- Buckman Mexico - Cuernavaca, Mexico
- Buckman North America - Memphis, Tennessee, USA; Cadet, Missouri, USA; Montreal, Quebec, Canada
- Buckman South Africa - Hammarsdale, Kwa-Zulu Natal, South Africa
