= Nalco Water =

Naperville-based supplier of water and air improvement services for industrial markets

Nalco Water, An Ecolab Company
- Type: Wholly Owned Subsidiary
- Industry: Chemicals and water treatment
- Predecessor: National Aluminate Corporation (1928 – 1959); Nalco Chemical Company (1959 – 1999); Ondeo Nalco Company (1999 – 2003)
- Founded: 1928 (as National Aluminate Corporation); 1959 ( as Nalco Chemical Company); 1999 (as Ondeo Nalco Company); 2003 (as Nalco Holding Company); 2011 (as Nalco Holding Company, a subsidiary of Ecolab)
- Headquarters: Naperville, Illinois, United States
- Key people: Herbert Kern (founder), Wilson Evans (co-founder)
- Revenue: $3.9 billion (2007)
- Owner: Ecolab
- Number of employees: 11,500
- Website: Nalco Water Homepage

Nalco Water, an Ecolab Company, is an American supplier of water, energy and air improvement products and services for industrial and institutional markets, owned by Ecolab. The company sells various products and services designed to reduce energy, water and other natural resource consumption, enhance air quality, minimize environmental releases and improve productivity and end products.

The company was founded in 1928 as the National Aluminate Corporation, formed from the merger of Chicago Chemical Company and the Aluminum Sales Corporation. By a series of mergers and acquisition, its name was changed to Nalco Chemical Company (1959 – 1999); then Ondeo Nalco Company (1999 – 2004); and in 2004 to Nalco Holding Company. It became a subsidiary of Ecolab Inc. in December 2011 after the completion of the US$5.4 billion acquisition by Ecolab.

Nalco Water serves more than 70,000 customers employing over 11,500 employees operating in over 130 countries. Among its products is Corexit - an oil dispersant widely used in the Deepwater Horizon oil spill.

== History ==
The company traces its origins to 1928 in the United States with the establishment of National Aluminate Corporation - formed from the merger of Chicago Chemical Company and the Aluminum Sales Corporation. In 1959 it changed its name to Nalco Chemical Company; and in 1964, it became a publicly traded company listed on the New York Stock Exchange. It acquired Industrial Bio-Test Laboratories in 1966, and the marine business from Bull & Roberts (now Waltron) in 1984.

The company was delisted from NYSE and renamed to Ondeo Nalco Company, following its 1999 acquisition by the French company, Suez (presently GDF Suez).

On 9 December 2003, the private equity group consisting of the Blackstone Group, Apollo Management LP and Goldman Sachs Alternatives collaborated to acquire Ondeo Nalco Company from Suez SA for US$4.2 billion. The Company went public again, returning to the New York Stock Exchange in late 2004 under the name Nalco Holding Company.

In 2007, Nalco Water achieved sales of more than US$3.9 billion.

In July 2011, Nalco Water announced a merger with Ecolab, Inc., and it became a wholly owned subsidiary of Ecolab Inc. in December 2011 after the completion of the US$5.4 billion acquisition by Ecolab.

== ExxonMobil ties ==
In 1994, Nalco Water and Exxon Chemical Company announced the formation of the joint venture, Nalco Exxon Energy Chemicals L.P., to provide products and services to all facets of the petroleum and natural gas industries. In 2001, NALCO, which by then named 'Ondeo Nalco', strengthened its position in the petroleum industry when Nalco Exxon Energy Chemicals, L.P. became part of the company through redemption of ExxonMobil stock in the joint venture. Daniel S. Sanders, who was previously president of Exxon Mobil Chemical Company, a subsidiary of ExxonMobil; serves on Nalco's (now, Ecolab's) board.

== Lobbying activity and political contributions ==
OpenSecrets documents Nalco Company Political Action Committee financial contributions to political candidates, with 2010 contributions to Judy Biggert (R-IL), Charles Boustany (R-LA), Dan Lipinski (D-IL), John Shimkus (R-IL) and Dick Durbin (D-IL).

OpenSecrets also lists Nalco Holding Company's spending on lobbying, including $160,000 in 2010 to Ogilvy Government Relations to lobby on their behalf to the U.S. House of Representatives and the Senate, the Department of the Interior, and the Environmental Protection Agency between April 1 and June 30 of 2010, on "issues related to the use of corexit 9500 in the Gulf of Mexico oil spill".
