= Virtually safe dose =

A virtually safe dose (VSD) may be determined for those carcinogens not assumed to have a threshold. Virtually safe doses are calculated by regulatory agencies to represent the level of exposure to such carcinogenic agents at which an excess of cancers greater than that level accepted by society is not expected.

== See also ==
- Dose-response relationship
- Linear no-threshold model
