= Biogeochemical Cycles of Anthropogenic Contaminants =

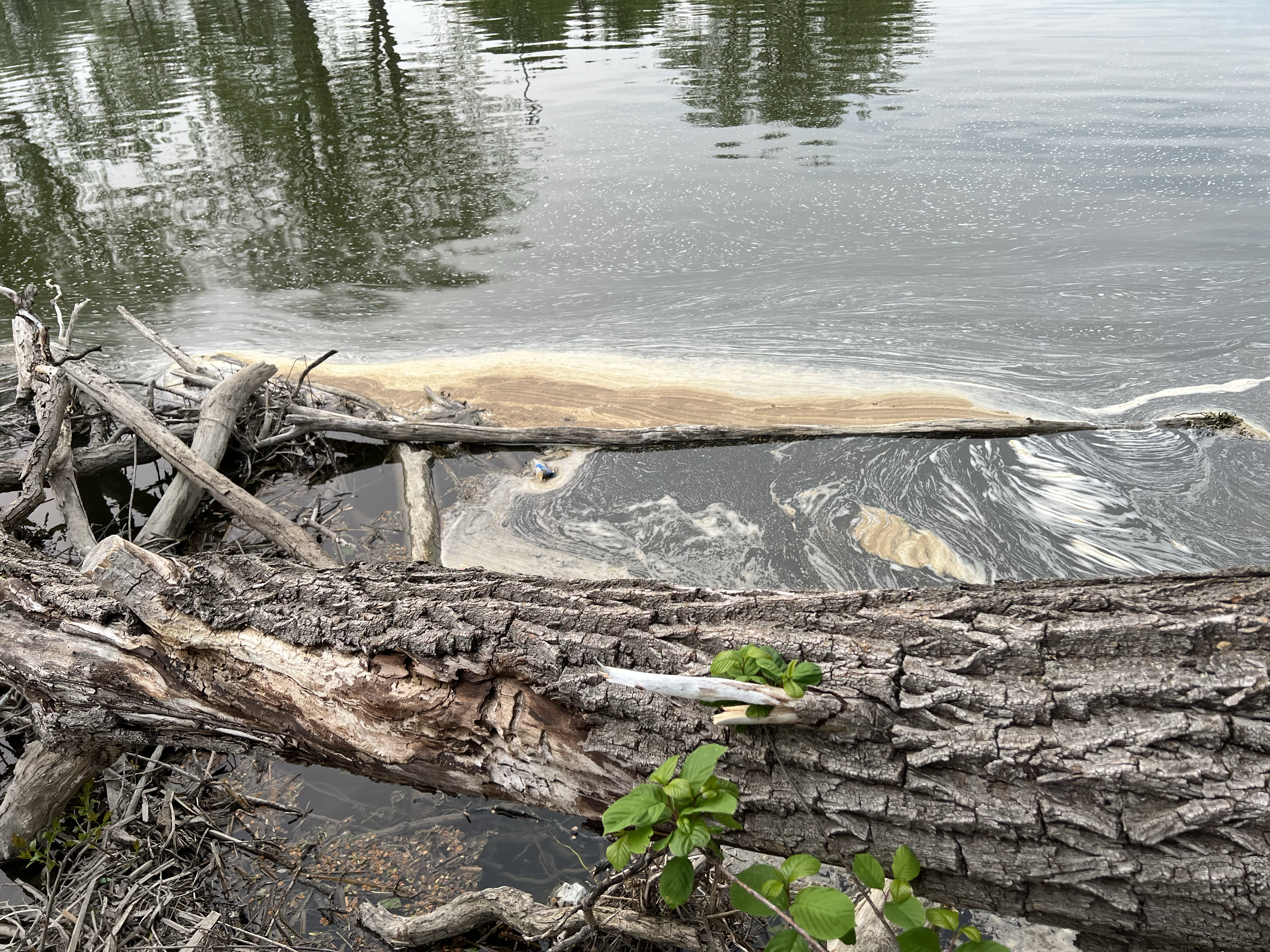
PFAS pollution along the Huron River, depicting the hydrological cycling of an anthropogenic compound.

Anthropogenic contaminants are compounds that derive from human activity related to industry, fossil fuel burning, agriculture, sewage and other waste that affect ecosystems through bioaccumulation and biomagnification. These contaminants are sometimes referred to as contaminants of emerging concern (CEC's) or persistent organic pollutants (POP's). The characteristics of contaminants depend on the chemical composition of the compound, and the residence time of the compound also depends on its chemical composition. These contaminants may have a significant effect on ecosystem dynamics and nutrient cycling based on short and long time scales.

Key questions remain regarding the mobility and persistence of these compounds in the environment. The biogeochemical cycling of anthropogenic contaminants sheds light on distribution and mechanisms that control the fate of these compounds in the natural environment. The emission of anthropogenic contaminants may follow point source or non-point source pollution. Point source pollution typically comes from a single identifiable place, such as manufacturing plants, landfills, industrial infrastructure, and water treatment facilities. Non-point source pollution is typically the result of pollutants released in a wide area, such as runoff products or atmospheric deposition. Anthropogenic contaminants may still be persistent in the environment spite of legal guidelines in manufacturing.

== Pollutants of interest ==
Biogeochemical cycling of anthropogenic contaminants occurs through various solid-phase, dissolved, gaseous, and biological forms. The soil solution (sum of dissolved chemical species and soluble chemical complexes) can be thought of as a regulator of contaminant fate.

=== Pesticides ===
Depiction of the general biogeochemical cycle of pesticides.

Pesticides are chemical compounds that are used to control, eliminate, or destroy pests in order to protect human food sources and health. Pesticides include compounds known as insecticides, herbicides, fungicides, rodenticides, and algicides. Pesticides are generally categorized based on their chemical composition and mode of action: organochlorines, organophosphates, carbamatess, and pyrethroidss. Most pesticides are considered to be POPs. The Stockholm Convention on POPs identified notable pesticides such as aldrin, chlordane, dieldrin, endrin, heptachlor, hexachlorobenzene (HCB), mirex, toxaphene, dichlorodiphenyltrichloroethane (DDT), hexachlorocyclohexane (alpha and beta), chlordecone, dicofol, methoxychlor, pentachlorobenzene, and endosulfan. The major source of pesticides is application in agricultural settings. Notable manufactures of these compounds include BASF, Bayer, DuPont, and Syngenta.

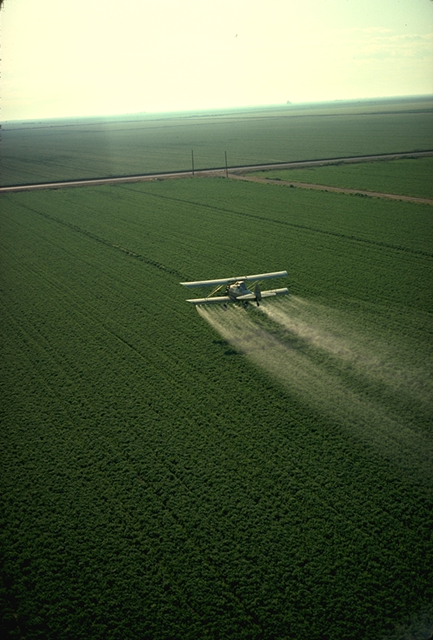
Crop-duster airplane applying pesticides. Improper application of pesticides may lead to larger contamination and unintended runoff of pesticides.

Pesticides may undergo complex transformations depending on their chemical composition and physical structure, as well as the environmental conditions like temperature, pH, redox, light availability, organic matter availability, and land-use history. The processes that affect the persistence of pesticides in the environment include photodegradation, chemical degradation, microbial degradation. The processes that impact the mobility of pesticides in the environment include sorption, plant uptake, volatilization from soil, volatilization from foliage, wind erosion, runoff, and leaching. Atmospheric deposition of pesticides occurs through precipitation and spray drift, which results from pesticide not adsorbing to the targeted product indicating a potential error in the application process. Microbial degradation is more likely when pesticides are repeatedly used in the same field.

It is assumed that the residence time of pesticides in soil is indefinite because they degrade slowly in soils. However, it is possible to determine the environmental fate of a specific pesticide knowing the biochemical half-life of the pesticide, soil sorption coefficient, water solubility, vapor pressure, and Groundwater Ubiquity Score. For example, in the absence of colloid-mediated transport, the soil residence time of DDT, chlordane, heptachlor, and dieldrin would range between 20 and 100 years. Pesticides may eventually be transported from the continent to continental shelves into the open ocean. Monitoring data have shown that dicofol is sufficiently persistent to be transported via riverine input to the open sea and to be detected in deep sediment layers dated back several decades. It is possible that different ocean basins act as sources or sinks of the pesticides depending on the air-seawater exchange and continental and riverine fluxes.

=== PFAS ===
Perfluorooctane sulfonamide (PFOS), which is a notable PFAS regulated under the EPA.

Per- and polyfluoroalkyl substances (PFAS) are a class of human made compounds that generally consist of an alkyl carbon chain with fluorines saturating most carbons and at least one functional group. The presence of the carbon to fluorine bond allows PFAS to be strongly resistance to heat, chemical breakdown and microbial breakdown. This stability leads to PFAS persisting for decades and upwards of one thousand years in soils and water, which yields the nickname - "forever chemicals". PFAS are most broadly categorized as long-chain or short-chain PFAS. Long-chain PFAS tend to have strong sorption onto organic matter and mineral surfaces, while short-chain PFAS are usually more mobile. The distinction between the long-chain and short-chain PFAS is related to the number of carbon atoms in alkyl chains, fluorine atoms, and functional groups like carboxylic acid and sulfonic acid.

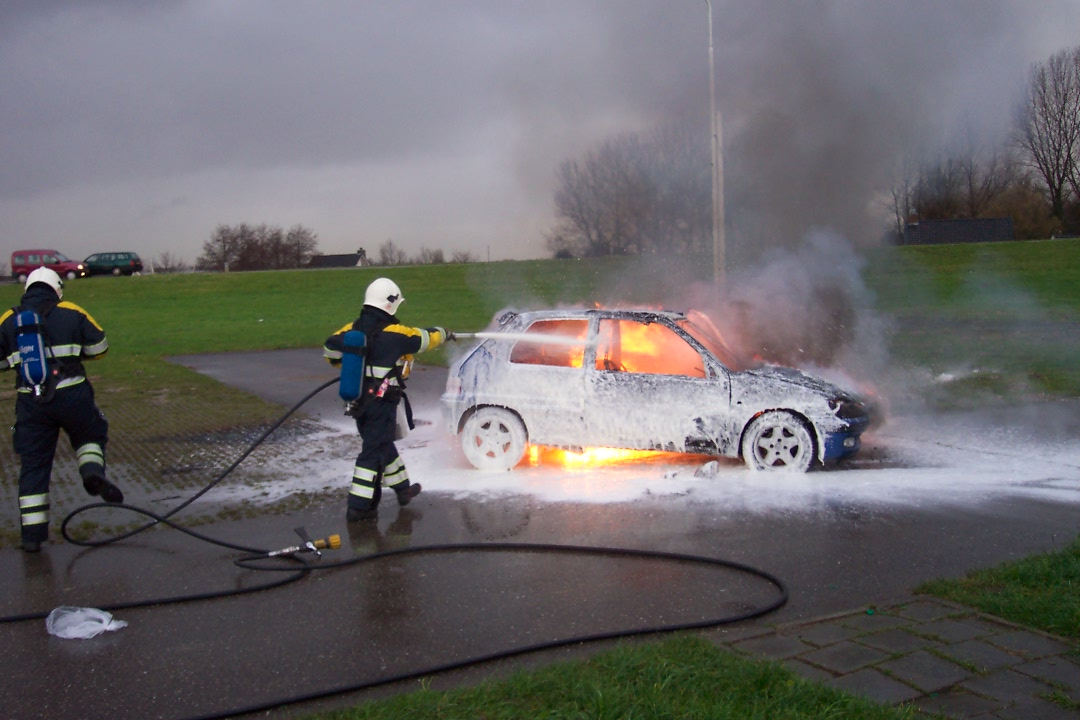
PFAS is commonly used in fire fighting foams.

Fluoroplastic compounds were first used during the Manhattan project to separate uranium hexafluoride isotopes. However, PFAS are now used widely in consumer products. There are thousands of different PFAS, but some are more well studied and more widely used. Although some PFAS like perfluorooctanoic acid (PFOA) and perfluorooctane sulfonate (PFOS) have been phased out from commercial products, they have long residence times in the environment because of historical use. Release of PFAS to the environment occurs during the production, use, and disposal of materials containing PFAS from primary manufacturing sites or secondary manufacturing facilities. Major manufacturing and industry sources include building and construction materials; cable and wiring; metal finishing and plating; surfactants and fluoropolymer production; paper products and packaging; semiconductor uses; textiles, leather, and apparel (including carpet and furniture upholstery), among others. Wastewater treatment plants, landfills, and use of Aqueous Film Forming Foam (AFFF) during fire training, fire response, or fire suppression are also considered major sources of PFAS to the environment. Notable manufacturers of PFAS products include 3M and DuPont. General mechanisms of release of PFAS from industrial facilities include wastewater and stormwater discharges, on- and off-site disposal of solid waste, leaching into surface soils and groundwater, accidental release during leaks and spills, and stack and fugitive emissions. Stack emissions may lead to wet or dry atmospheric deposition of PFAS to soil and surface water, which can subsequently result in leaching and groundwater infiltration.

Once the molecule is introduced into the environment, the factors that affect the fate and transport of PFAS are dependent on the chemical characteristics of the PFAS molecule itself (e.g. functional groups, fluorination) and the characteristics of the environment the PFAS is introduced to. One consequence of the inherent chemistry of PFAS is that there may be heterogeneity in PFAS distribution in the environment given that PFAS have both hydrophobic tails and hydrophilic heads. Similarly, these chemicals exhibit a wide range of different rates of degradation in the environment, with different functional groups potentially being further modified in the environment to other types of PFAS. Important environmental conditions like soil mineralogy, organic matter content, pH conditions, oxidation-reduction conditions, precipitation, infiltration rates, groundwater velocities/flow directions, groundwater-surface water interactions, surface water flow rates, atmospheric conditions, and the presence of co-contaminants. It is not uncommon for PFAS to partition between multiple solid phases, such as soils and sediment, organic matter, human waste, sewage, and iron oxides. Therefore, the impact of PFAS on biogeochemical cycles in an environment is site-specific. Due to the chemical composition it is possible for PFAS to bioaccumulate in both terrestrial and marine environments.

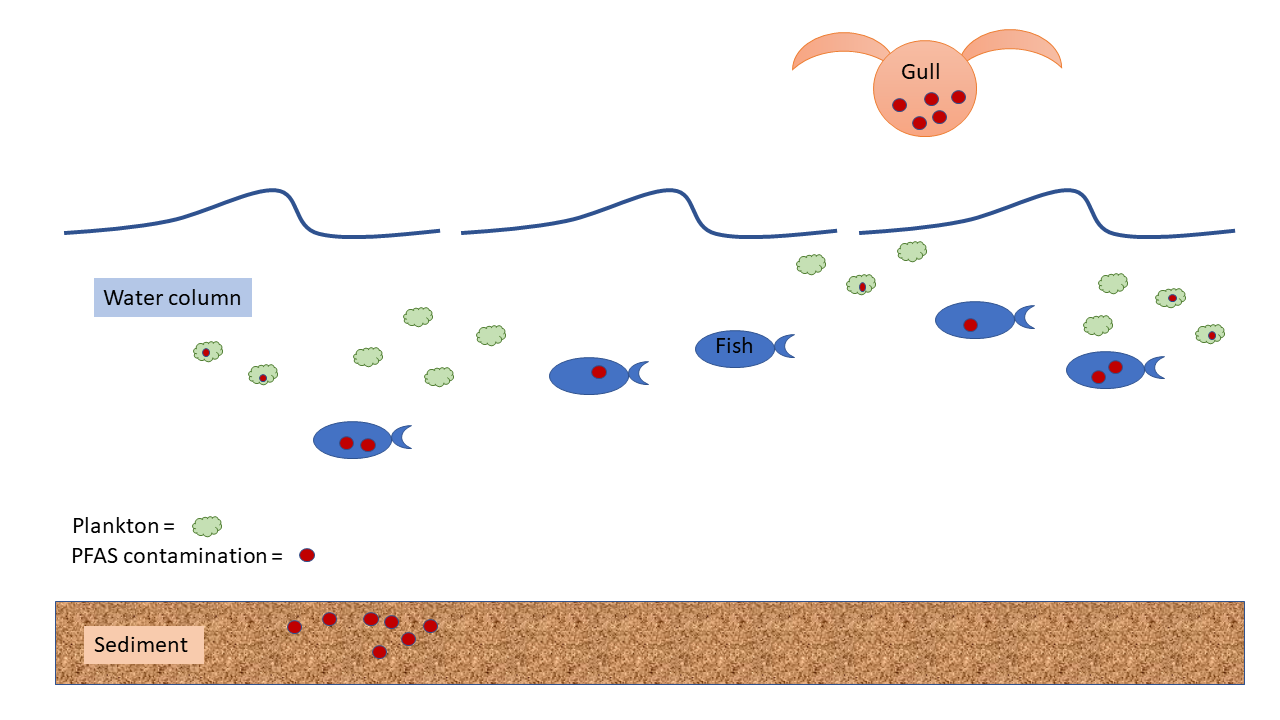
Biomagnification of PFAS in the marine environment.

PFAS may interfere with biogeochemical cycling by altering the soil bacterial and fungal community structures. However, determining how PFAS directly interacts with the major biogeochemical cycles like carbon, nitrogen, oxygen, phosphorus, and sulfur and minor biogeochemical cycles warrants more studies, especially conducted in the field. There is evidence from controlled lab experiments that in some bacterial and archaeal communities exposed to PFAS, there can be a reduction in the abundance of nitrification genes and denitrification genes, leading to a build up of ammonium and a decrease in nitrite and nitrate content. Nitrate and sulfate-reducing bacteria have exhibited metabolic inhibition in the presence of PFAS, which has led to an excess of nitrate and sulfate in soils. Any changes in soil pH and microbial and fungal activity leads to shifts in nutrient availability for plants, which can influence the timing and magnitude of carbon and nitrogen export to the hydrosphere.

=== Pharmaceuticals and personal care products ===
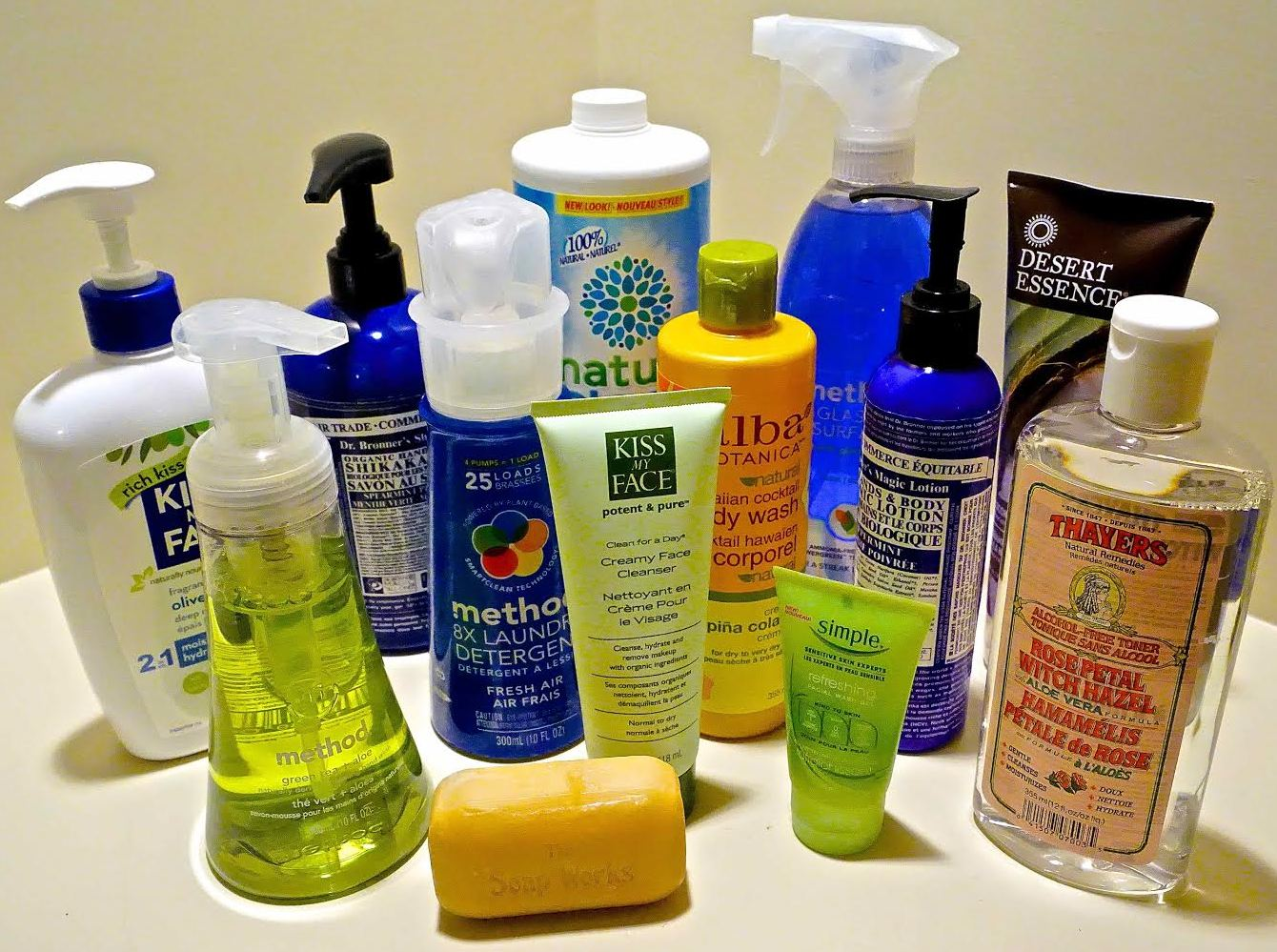
Examples of various types of pharmaceutical and personal care products (PPCPs) that may be found in a household.

Pharmaceuticals and personal care products (PPCPs) include a wide suite of antibiotics, analgesics, steroids, antidepressants, antipyretics, stimulants, antimicrobials, disinfectants, fragrances, cosmetics, and many other chemicals that are widely used on a daily basis for various purposes. Veterinary medicines are also considered PPCPs, although their concentrations tend to be higher near agricultural activity like animal feeding operations. PPCPs may enter the environment by direct discharge into surface water from manufacturing, hospitals, households, wastewater treatment plants, and agricultural runoff. Different continents are different point sources of PPCPs. Due to the widespread use of PPCPs in every day life, environmental inputs are mostly continuous rather than intermittent, which results a persistent background of low level contamination. Nevertheless, there is the potential for seasonality due to climate and recreational activities.

Some PPCPs are more reactive in the environment than others due to their chemistry (e.g. functional groups, molecular structure, volatility, polarity, and photo-stability). These compounds occur as complex mixtures, which impacts solubility and residence times. Once in the environment, PPCPs are impacted by pH, redox conditions, soil mineralogy, hydrology, temperature, microbial activity, and the presence of organic matter. The main removal mechanisms of PPCPs are adsorption onto mineral surfaces and organic matter, absorption, photolysis, hydrolysis, volatilization, and microbial degradation. Depending on the redox conditions of the environment, some PPCPs are removed from solution under oxic conditions, while some are only removed under anoxic conditions. A study of over 250 rivers in over 100 nations analyzed over 60 active pharmaceutical ingredients and found that the presence of at least one these active ingredients was prevalent in about 26% of the sampling locations in concentrations greater than is deemed safe for aquatic organisms or selection for microbial resistance, which could suggest that some fraction of PPCPs persist in freshwater environments.

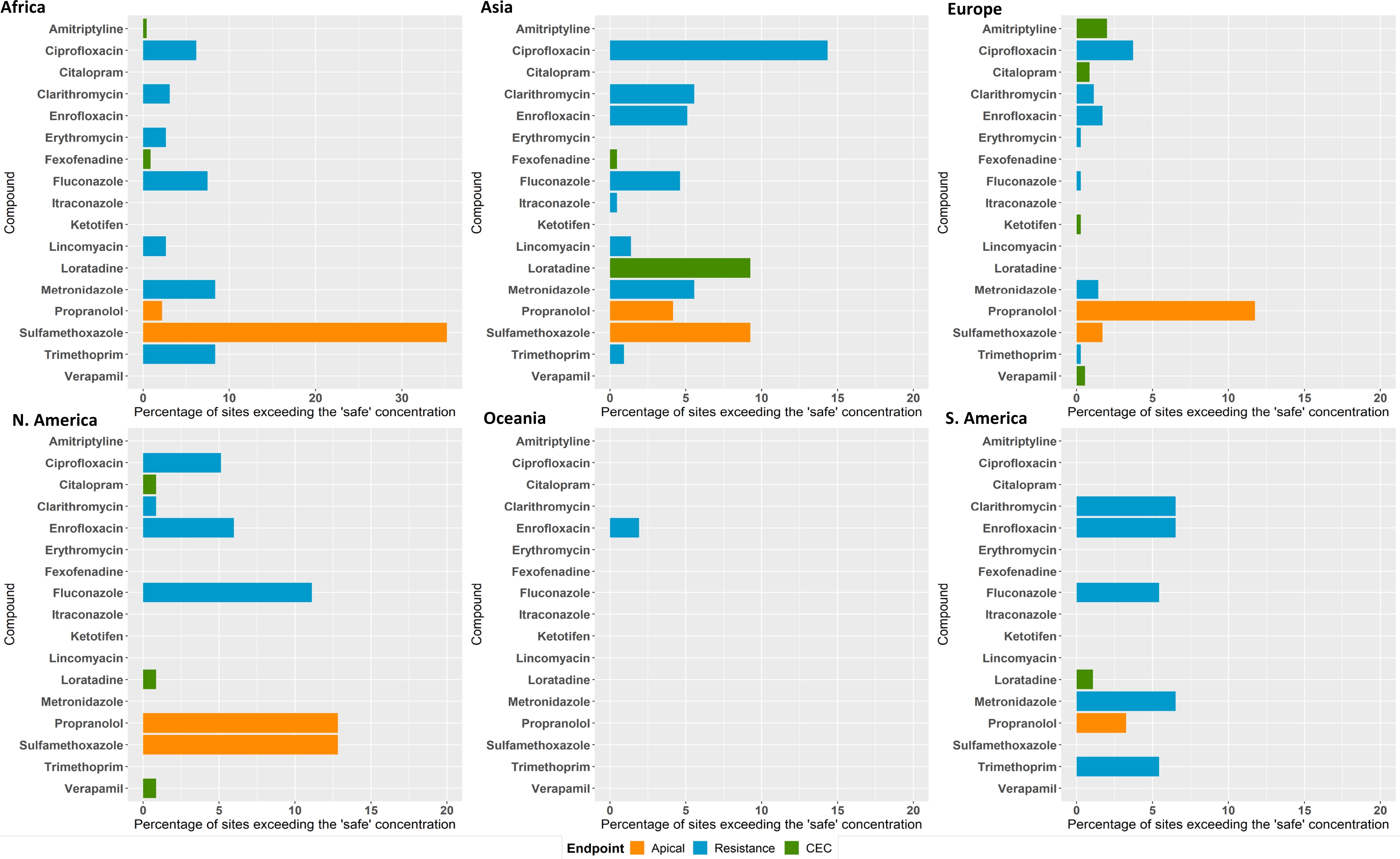
Pharmaceutical pollution based on the compounds from the world's rivers, which compares concentrations exceeding "safe" limits.

The impacts of pharmaceuticals on biogeochemical cycles are observed in the way they alter and disrupt the microbial communities that facilitate these cycles. In the marine environment, increased turbidity, electrical conductivity, pH, and salinity were observed to lead to increases in PPCPs, although a decrease in temperature and dissolved oxygen led to lower concentrations of PPCPs. In addition to the aforementioned variables, the distribution of PPCPs in sediments varies as a function of the sediment composition and sedimentation rates, the latter of which is variable depending on the features of the studied sites (relief, discharge, off-shore wind and wave energy). Sediments may serve as sources or sinks of PPCPs, although there is the possibility of reintroducing PPCPs into the water column when sediment is disrupted. Sediments in Asia and Africa have been recorded to have the highest concentrations of PPCPs. Once in the marine environment, many PPCPs are immobilized by biological uptake of these compounds, which in turn impacts ecosystem productivity and biodiversity due to chronic exposure.

There is some evidence that increased antibiotics can lead to decrease in nitrification rates. Some PCPs are capable of serving as alternative organic carbon sources for microbial metabolisms, resulting in the potential for nitrification and denitrification to occur. There is also some evidence that PPCPs such as sulfadiazine, sulfamethoxazole, amoxicillin, tetracycline, ciprofloxacin, and trimethoprim can all be adsorbed by plastic fragments, suggesting that the biogeochemical cycle of PPCPs may be tied to other anthropogenic contaminants like microplastics.

=== PBDE ===
Polybrominated Diphenyl Ethers (PBDEs) are a class of anthropogenic compounds used most commonly as flame retardants. There are many formal classifications of the family and type of PBDEs. Production of PBDEs in the U.S. began in the 1970s and peaked in the late 1990s. In the United States, the manufacturing of the PBDEs penta-DBE and octa-BDE were phased out in 2004, and the manufacturing of deca-BDEs was phased out by the end of 2013. In 2009, tetra-BDEs, penta-BDEs, hexa-BDEs, hepta-BDEs, octa-BDEs, and nona-BDEs were listed as POPs under the Stockholm Convention due to their hazards. Notable manufacturers of PBDE in the United States were Albermarle Corporation and the Great Lakes Corporation (later Chemtura). Although the production of these chemicals has stopped, PBDEs persist in the environment.

PBDEs are not chemically bound to the plastics, foam, fabrics, or other products they are used in, making them more likely to leach out of these products. PBDE's contamination arises from both industrial sources and more diffuse pathways. Point sources of these include manufacturing facilities, electronic waste recycling plants, and wastewater treatment centers. These facilities often handle large volumes of PBDE containing materials, making them important locations for documented environmental contamination. Non-point sources include the atmospheric deposition of dust filled with PBDE's, leaching from consumer products such as carpets and diffuse runoff from urban and industrial landscapes. PBDE's have also been detected coming from household dust, furniture, electronics, and from carpets/window drapes. Ultimately, the release of PBDE's introduces these contaminants to soils, sediments, surface water, and groundwater through dust, waste water, atmospheric deposition (wet and dry), photodegradation (photolysis), and runoff from near by landfills and industrial sites.

Poly brominated diphenyl ether molecular structure

PBDEs are highly brominated, hydrophobic, and thus more resistant to degradation because of their chemical structure. This molecular composition results in accumulation of PBDEs in most environments they are introduced into. PBDE's can also undergo debromination, forming lower bromate congeners that may become more bioavailable and become more toxic to aquatic ecosystems. PBDEs have been removed from the atmosphere via chemical reactions with OH^{-} and NO_{3}^{-} radicals and photolysis with UV light. Environmental conditions such as organic matter content, sediment texture, and redox state influence how PBDEs transform between solid and aqueous phase. There is some evidence that low oxygen conditions leads to slower PBDE degradation, while higher oxygen areas may result in faster degradation rates. PBDEs have very low water solubility, and when these substances are released to water, they typically bind to sediment and organic matter, thus soils are considered a major sink for these contaminants. PBDEs may remain in soils and sediments for upwards of a decade or more with minimal chemical transformation. In addition to burial depth and bioturbation, there is some evidence the degree of hydrophobicity of PBDEs impacts the extent of remobilization of these contaminants and the distribution between particulate and dissolved phases.

Therefore, it is possible that both soils and coastal environments may serve as sources or sinks of PBDEs from the land to the ocean partially depending on environmental factors and bioturbation. As a consequence of long-range transported pollution, air–sea gas exchange of PBDEs can become a major source of these contaminants in remote marine environments. As of 2016, there were concentrations of PBDEs found in the Arctic Ocean, including in the Arctic Deep Water Layer down to 2500 m depth. It is possible that different ocean basins and different source waters may serve as sources or sinks of PBDEs.

The direct and magnitude of impact on PBDE abundance on microbial and fungal communities remain open research questions, although any alterations to these communities ultimately impacts biogoechemical cycling of PBDEs. It is possible that organohalide respiring bacteria are key to the biogeochemical cycling of PBDE. There is some evidence that the structure and composition of bacterial and archeal communities can be disrupted. In several different lab experiments altering exposure of soil microbial communities to different types and concentrations of PBDEs, it was found that PBDEs generally stimulated nitrification and denitrification. In some incubations of microbial and plant communities in mangrove soils in southern China, there was evidence that PBDEs may decrease nitrification, stimulate denitrification, and inhibit anammox. The effects of PBDEs on microbial transformations that then impact plants are species-specific.

=== Microplastics ===
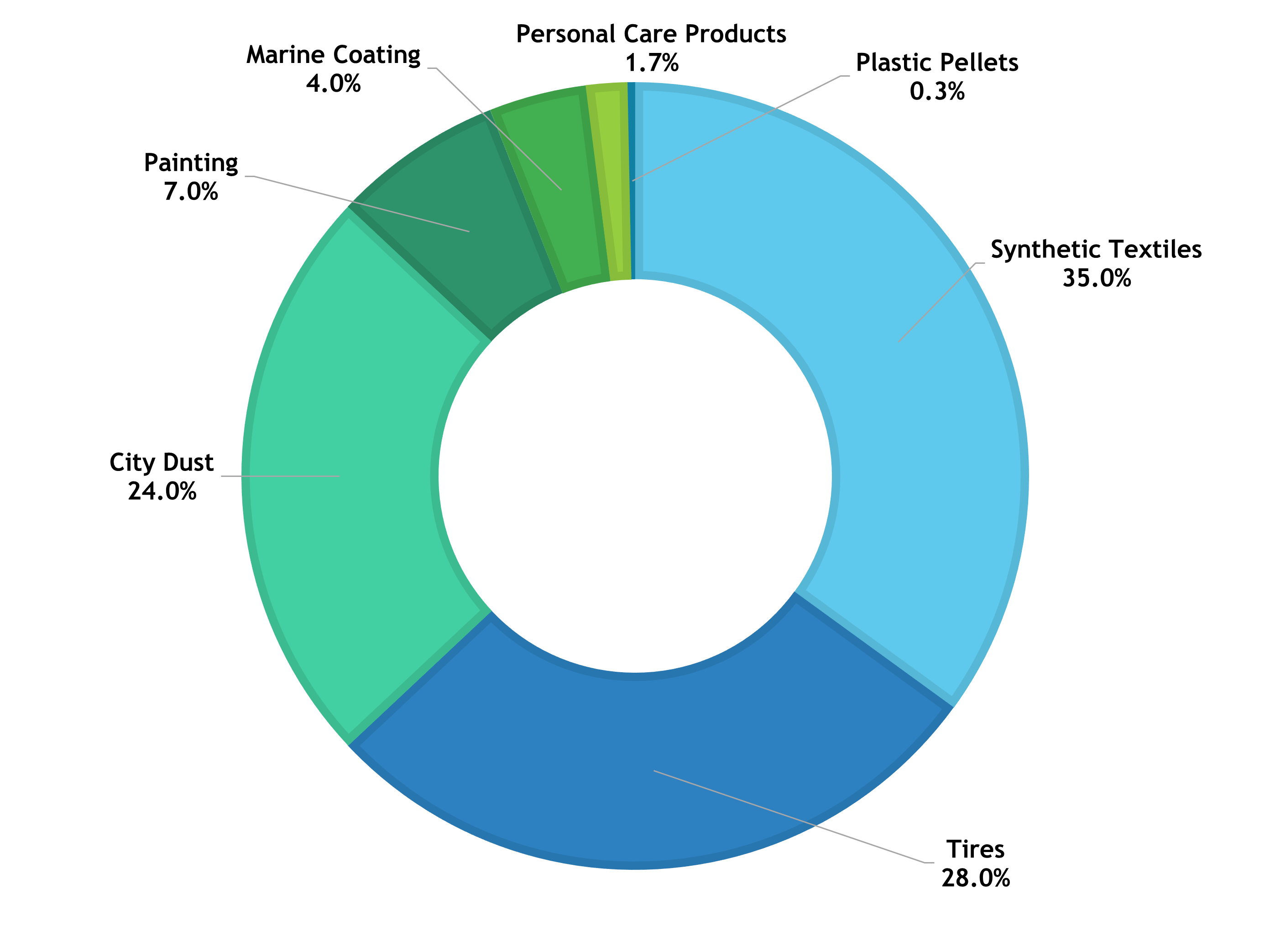
Major sources of microplastics in the ocean.

Microplastics have been found in every ecosystem on the planet, from the Antarctic tundra to tropical coral reefs, and have been found in food, beverages, and human and animal tissue. These debris are defined as small pieces of plastic less than 5 mm long. Microplastics are derived from a wide array of sources due to the economic development of the world and introduced to the environment daily. Roughly 79% of the plastic that is manufactured gets placed in the landfill or environment, the rest is either recovered or consumed. Examples of sources of microplastics include clothing, tires, construction materials, packaging, industrial activity, cosmetics, and manufacturing. There are many manufacturers of microplastics around the world, although certain locations may be higher magnitude sources of these contaminants from the land to the ocean. Microplastic abundance in the environment is influenced by the vegetation land-use history, climate, coastal environment, and river runoff, including seasonality. Microplastics may be derived from larger plastic waste that may degrade to smaller pieces due to physical weathering, chemical weathering, biological degradation, or UV radiation. Microplastic contaminants are generally insoluble in water and thought to be relatively unreactive.

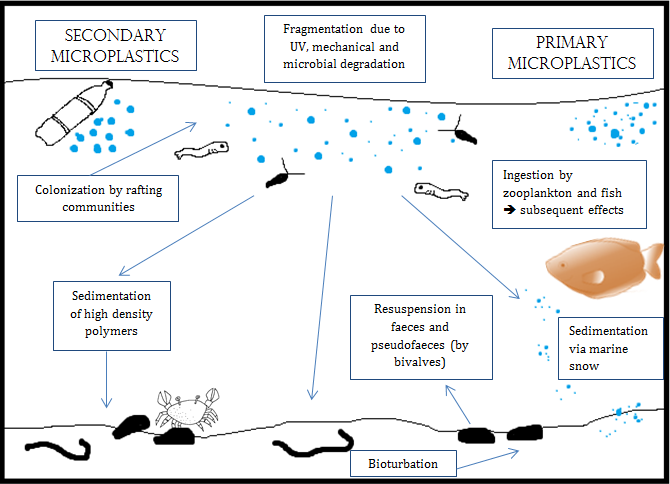
Biogeochemical mechanisms of microplastic distribution in the marine environment.

The main sources of microplastics throughout the Earth system are road runoff, waste water treatment plants, dust, atmospheric deposition, and marine activities. Terrestrial soils and vegetation are considered the major sinks of microplastics, although depending on environmental factors like pH, soil texture and composition, plant-species, microbial activity, climate, etc., soils and vegetation may also act as sources of microplastics in the environment. In coastal regions with humid climates and low latitudes, plastics or microplastics accumulate more and are susceptible to weathering. However, regional variability still exists within climatic zones. Coastal environments may be sources or sinks of microplastics.

Plant uptake of microplastics depends on the species, land-use practices, and soil chemical and physical properties. There is evidence of the presence of microplastics in soils altering microbial activity, and therefore impacting biogoechemical cycling in the soil. It is also possible that microplastics may adsorb and chelate with phosphorus containing compounds, which may reduce the essential nutrient P availability for plants. Biogeochemical cycling of microplastics may result in the transfer of other pollutants through the environment, or these contaminants may impact biogeochemical cycles of other pollutants, like the degradation pathways for phthalates and bisphenol A (BPA). Microplastics may inhibit the natural cycling of nitrogen and carbon by impairing the enzymes involved in the degradation of terrestrial and marine organic matter.

There is evidence from controlled lab experiments that as a result of accumulation of microplastics in ocean waters, organic matter stable and radiogenic isotopic composition can be significantly biased to appear of different composition and age. This in turn impacts understanding of the biogeochemical cycling of carbon in marine environments. Microplastics have the ability to form biofilms that may also impact microbial community structures and both freshwater and ocean carbon cycling. Microplastics may alter the N cycle by altering the expression of N transforming enzymes, ultimately impacting the structure of nitrifiers and denitrifiers. There is some evidence that microplastics will adsorb onto the surfaces of microbes, which may lead to increased potential rapid sinking of marine particulate matter.

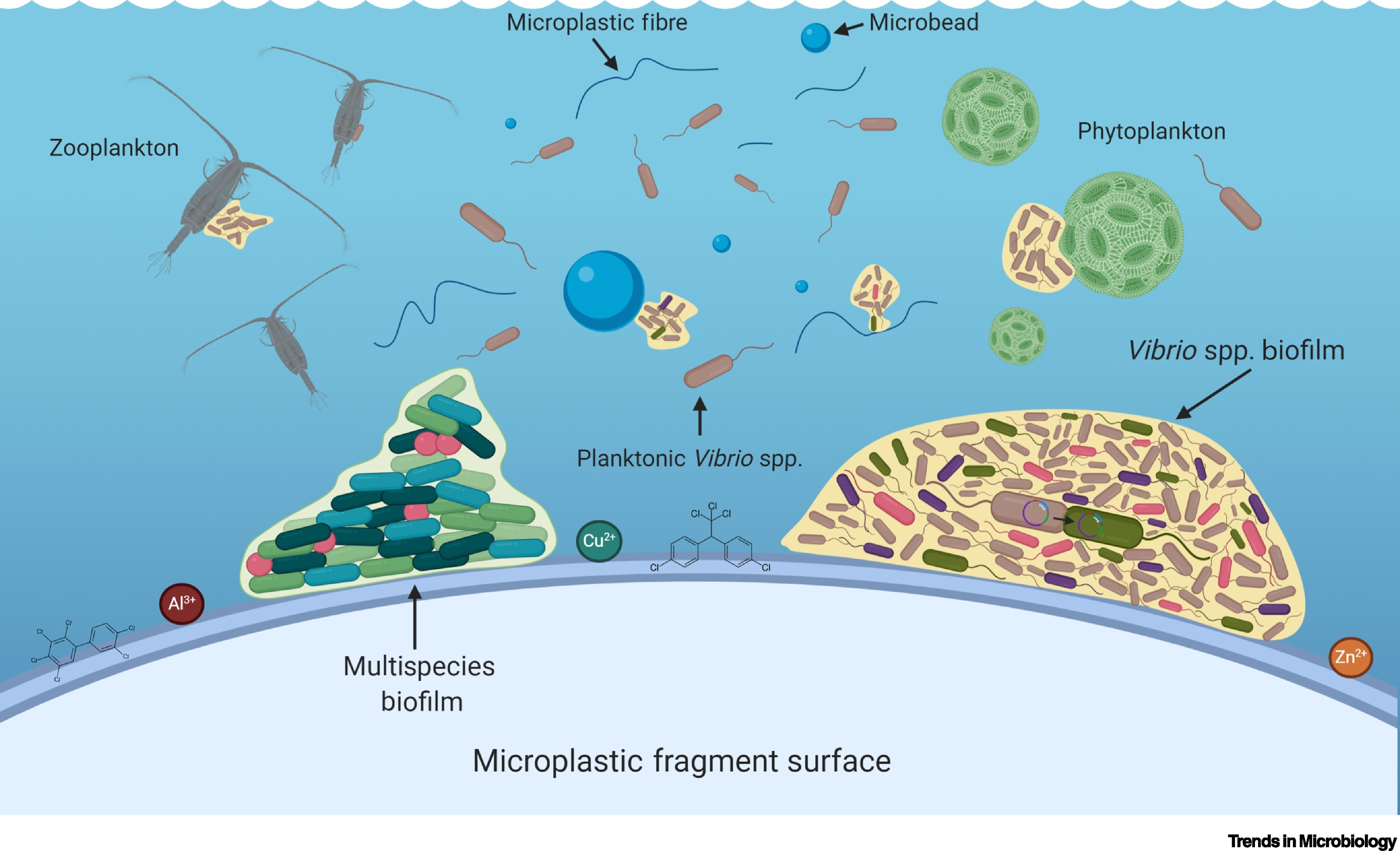
Surface microbial interactions with microplastics in zooplankton and phytoplankton in the ocean.

Trace metals may also interact through sorption processes with microplastics, impacting the biogeochemical cycles of trace metals and microplastics; however, the likelihood of sorption/desorption is heavily dependent on the salinity of the environment, presence of organic matter, the nature of the microplastic (e.g. size, charge, functional groups, concentration of trace metals in dissolved versus particulate phases, and the chemical speciation of the metal, among other factors. Differences in the sorption kinetics of metals (e.g. Cu and Zn) and metalloids (e.g. As) to the surfaces of microplastics may also impact ecosystem dynamics and biogeochemical cycles.

=== Dioxins, furans, and PCBs ===
Isomers of Dioxane.

Dioxins, furans, and some polychlorinated biphenyls (PCBs) are a family of anthropogenic contaminants that have similar chemical structures. Most dioxins and furans are unintentional byproducts of chemical or industrial product manufacturing through combustion processes in the presence of chlorinated compounds. Of all of the dioxins and furans, one, 2,3,7,8-tetrachloro-p-dibenzo-dioxin (2,3,7,8 TCDD) is considered the most toxic. 1, 4-dioxane is considered a trace contaminant of cosmetic products and ingredients. Primary sources of production include coal burning, metal smelting and refining, incinerating bleaching processes used in pulp and paper mills, and the chemical syntheses of compounds such as trichlorophenoxyacetic acid, hexachlorophene, vinyl chloride, trichlorophenol, and pentachlorophenol. Stack emissions are considered important in transporting these anthropogenic compounds to the atmosphere. In addition to industrial sources, civilian activity such as burning of waste, burning biomass, oil heating, and using diesel vehicles may be sources of dioxins. PCBs were once synthesized for use as heat-exchanger, transformer, and hydraulic fluids, and also used as additives to paints, oils, window caulking, and floor tiles. Production of PCBs peaked in the early 1970s, but it was banned in the United States after 1979. Environmental regulations of these anthropogenic contaminants are not universal. The United States Department of Health and Human Services National Toxicology Program found 1,4-dioxane to be a human carcinogen, but studies of trace contaminations of some dioxanes like 1,4-dioxane by the International Cooperation on Cosmetics Regulations and the European Commission Scientific Committee on Consumer Safety have examined the issue and determined trace concentrations of certain dioxin compounds are safe for consumers at trace levels.

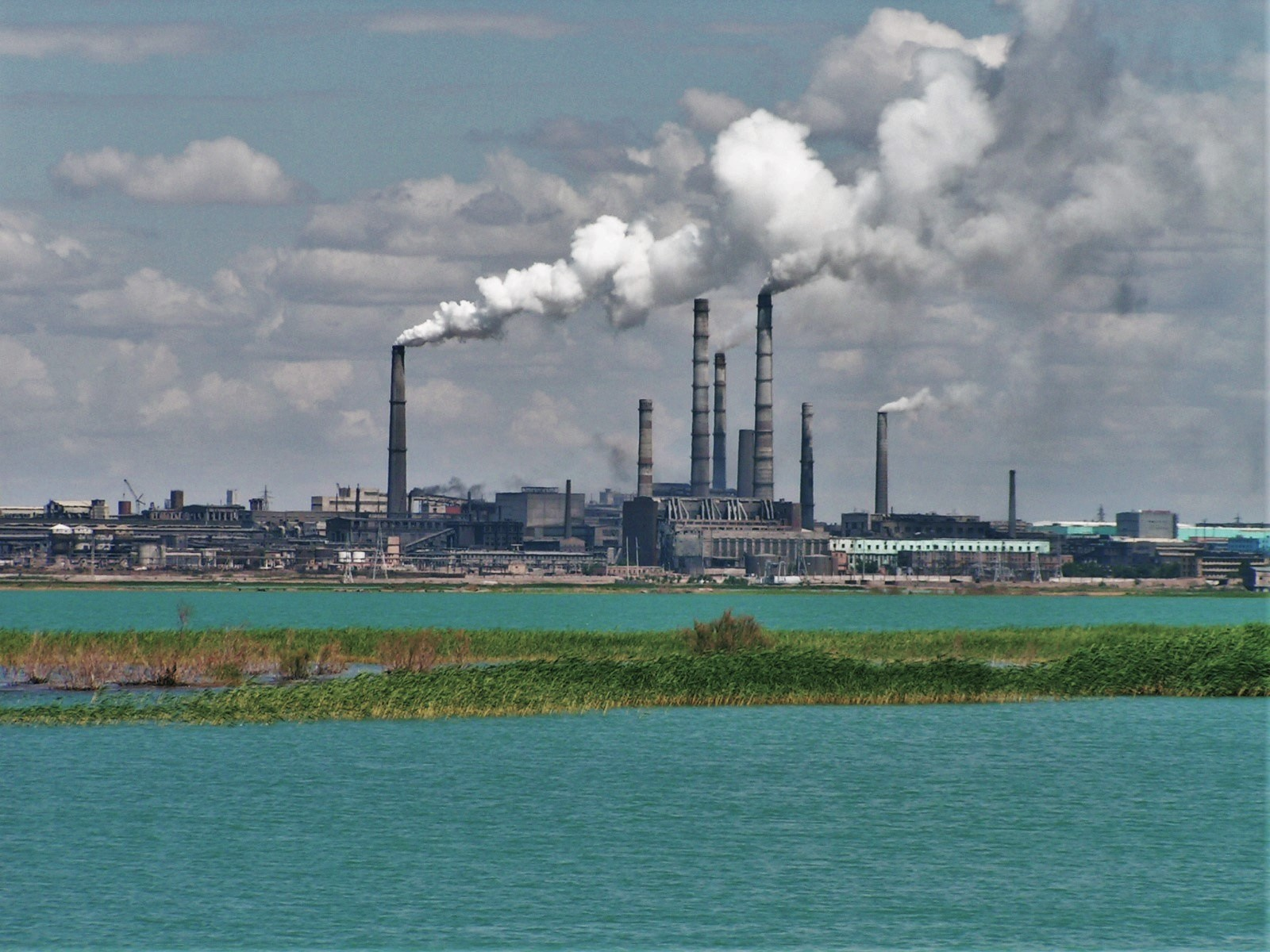
A copper smelting plant, which is a common source of dioxanes and furans.

Dioxins have two phenyl rings connected by two oxygen atoms. Furans have one or two phenyl rings connected to a furan ring. PCBs have two phenyl rings attached at one point. The formation of dioxins is local, but the environmental distribution is global. Dioxins, furans, and PCBs may undergo photochemical transformations, which may produce toxic chlorinated compounds. The environmental processes that result in the mobilization of dioxins, furans, and PCBs are fairly well known. These compounds are relatively insoluble, thus they are found associated with organic matter and mineral surfaces in soil and sediment. When These compounds are classified as semi-volatile, meaning that changes in temperature, especially warming and decrease in barometric pressure, may result in volatilization of these compounds.

There is evidence for long-range transport of these compounds from the land to the ocean. The likelihood of most dioxins in leaching from soil is less likely than their voltilization and subsequent atmospheric transport; however, there is evidence of the 1,4-dioxane and dioxin-like PCBs in soils with low organic content leaching into groundwater. More research is needed to understand the direct impact of dioxins, furans, and PCBs on the biogeochemical cycles of nitrogen, phosphorus, carbon, sulfur, oxygen, and trace metals.
