= Persistent organic pollutant =

Organic compounds that are resistant to environmental degradation

Persistent organic pollutants (POPs) are organic compounds that are resistant to degradation through chemical, biological, and photolytic processes. They are toxic and adversely affect human health and the environment around the world. Because they can be transported by wind and water, most POPs generated in one country can and do affect people and wildlife far from where they are used and released.

The effect of POPs on human and environmental health was discussed, with intention to eliminate or severely restrict their production, by the international community at the Stockholm Convention on Persistent Organic Pollutants in 2001.

Most POPs are pesticides or insecticides, and some are also solvents, pharmaceuticals, and industrial chemicals. Although some POPs arise naturally (e.g. from volcanoes and forest fires), most are man-made. The "dirty dozen" POPs identified by the Stockholm Convention include aldrin, chlordane, dieldrin, endrin, heptachlor, HCB, mirex, toxaphene, PCBs, DDT, dioxins, and polychlorinated dibenzofurans. However, there have since been many new POPs added (e.g. PFOS).

== Consequences of persistence ==
POPs typically are halogenated organic compounds (see lists below) and as such exhibit high lipid solubility. For this reason, they bioaccumulate in fatty tissues. Halogenated compounds also exhibit great stability reflecting the nonreactivity of C-Cl bonds toward hydrolysis and photolytic degradation. The stability and lipophilicity of organic compounds often correlates with their halogen content, thus polyhalogenated organic compounds are of particular concern. They exert their negative effects on the environment through two processes: long range transport, which allows them to travel far from their source, and bioaccumulation, which reconcentrates these chemical compounds to potentially dangerous levels. Compounds that make up POPs are also classed as PBTs (persistent, bioaccumulative and toxic) or TOMPs (toxic organic micro pollutants).

=== Long-range transport ===
POPs enter the gas phase under certain environmental temperatures and volatilize from soils, vegetation, and bodies of water into the atmosphere, resisting breakdown reactions in the air, to travel long distances before being re-deposited. This results in accumulation of POPs in areas far from where they were used or emitted, specifically environments where POPs have never been introduced such as Antarctica, and the Arctic Circle. POPs can be present as vapors in the atmosphere or bound to the surface of solid particles (aerosols). A determining factor for the long-range transport is the fraction of a POP that is adsorbed on aerosols. In adsorbed form it is – as opposed to the gas phase – protected from photo-oxidation, i.e. direct photolysis as well as oxidation by OH radicals or ozone.

POPs have low solubility in water but are easily captured by solid particles, and are soluble in organic fluids (oils, fats, and liquid fuels). POPs are not easily degraded in the environment due to their stability and low decomposition rates. Due to this capacity for long-range transport, POP environmental contamination is extensive, even in areas where POPs have never been used, and will remain in these environments years after restrictions implemented due to their resistance to degradation.

=== Bioaccumulation ===
Bioaccumulation of POPs is typically associated with the compounds high lipid solubility and ability to accumulate in the fatty tissues of living organisms including human tissues for long periods of time. Persistent chemicals tend to have higher concentrations and are eliminated more slowly. Dietary accumulation or bioaccumulation is another hallmark characteristic of POPs, as POPs move up the food chain, they increase in concentration as they are processed and metabolized in certain tissues of organisms. The natural capacity for animals gastrointestinal tract to concentrate ingested chemicals, along with poorly metabolized and hydrophobic nature of POPs, makes such compounds highly susceptible to bioaccumulation. Thus POPs not only persist in the environment, but also as they are taken in by animals they bioaccumulate, increasing their concentration and toxicity in the environment. This increase in concentration is called biomagnification, which is where organisms higher up in the food chain have a greater accumulation of POPs. Bioaccumulation and long-range transport are the reason why POPs can accumulate in organisms like whales, even in remote areas like Antarctica.

== Stockholm Convention on Persistent Organic Pollutants ==
State parties to the Stockholm Convention on Persistent Organic Pollutants

The Stockholm Convention was adopted and put into practice by the United Nations Environment Programme (UNEP) on May 22, 2001. The UNEP decided that POP regulation needed to be addressed globally for the future. The purpose statement of the agreement is "to protect human health and the environment from persistent organic pollutants." As of 2024, there are 185 countries plus the European Union have ratified the Stockholm Convention. The convention and its participants have recognized the potential human and environmental toxicity of POPs. They recognize that POPs have the potential for long-range transport and bioaccumulation and biomagnification. The convention seeks to study and then judge whether or not a number of chemicals that have been developed with advances in technology and science can be categorized as POPs. The initial meeting in 2001 made a preliminary list, termed the "dirty dozen", of chemicals that are classified as POPs. As of 2024, the United States has signed the Stockholm Convention but has not ratified it. Most other countries have ratified the convention.

=== Compounds on the Stockholm Convention list ===
In May 1995, the UNEP Governing Council investigated POPs. Initially the Convention recognized only twelve POPs for their adverse effects on human health and the environment, placing a global ban on these particularly harmful and toxic compounds and requiring its parties to take measures to eliminate or reduce the release of POPs in the environment.

1. Aldrin, an insecticide used in soils to kill termites, grasshoppers, Western corn rootworm, and others, is also known to kill birds, fish, and humans. Humans are primarily exposed to aldrin through dairy products and animal meats.
2. Chlordane, an insecticide used to control termites and on a range of agricultural crops, is known to be lethal in various species of birds, including mallard ducks, bobwhite quail, and pink shrimp; it is a chemical that remains in the soil with a reported half-life of one year. Chlordane has been postulated to affect the human immune system and is classified as a possible human carcinogen. Chlordane air pollution is believed the primary route of human exposure.
3. Dieldrin, a pesticide used to control termites, textile pests, insect-borne diseases and insects living in agricultural soils. In soil and insects, aldrin can be oxidized, resulting in rapid conversion to dieldrin. Dieldrin's half-life is approximately five years. Dieldrin is highly toxic to fish and other aquatic animals, particularly frogs, whose embryos can develop spinal deformities after exposure to low levels. Dieldrin has been linked to Parkinson's disease, breast cancer, and classified as immunotoxic, neurotoxic, with endocrine disrupting capacity. Dieldrin residues have been found in air, water, soil, fish, birds, and mammals. Human exposure to dieldrin primarily derives from food.
4. Endrin, an insecticide sprayed on the leaves of crops, and used to control rodents. Animals can metabolize endrin, so fatty tissue accumulation is not an issue, however the chemical has a long half-life in soil for up to 12 years. Endrin is highly toxic to aquatic animals and humans as a neurotoxin. Human exposure results primarily through food.
5. Heptachlor, a pesticide primarily used to kill soil insects and termites, along with cotton insects, grasshoppers, other crop pests, and malaria-carrying mosquitoes. Heptachlor, even at very low doses has been associated with the decline of several wild bird populations – Canada geese and American kestrels. In laboratory tests have shown high-dose heptachlor as lethal, with adverse behavioral changes and reduced reproductive success at low-doses, and is classified as a possible human carcinogen. Human exposure primarily results from food.
6. Hexachlorobenzene (HCB) was first introduced in 1945–59 to treat seeds because it can kill fungi on food crops. HCB-treated seed grain consumption is associated with photosensitive skin lesions, colic, debilitation, and a metabolic disorder called porphyria turcica, which can be lethal. Mothers who pass HCB to their infants through the placenta and breast milk had limited reproductive success including infant death. Human exposure is primarily from food.
7. Mirex, an insecticide used against ants and termites or as a flame retardant in plastics, rubber, and electrical goods. Mirex is one of the most stable and persistent pesticides, with a half-life of up to 10 years. Mirex is toxic to several plant, fish and crustacean species, with suggested carcinogenic capacity in humans. Humans are exposed primarily through animal meat, fish, and wild game.
8. Toxaphene, an insecticide used on cotton, cereal, grain, fruits, nuts, and vegetables, as well as for tick and mite control in livestock. Widespread toxaphene use in the US and chemical persistence, with a half-life of up to 12 years in soil, results in residual toxaphene in the environment. Toxaphene is highly toxic to fish, inducing dramatic weight loss and reduced egg viability. Human exposure primarily results from food. While human toxicity to direct toxaphene exposure is low, the compound is classified as a possible human carcinogen.
9. Polychlorinated biphenyls (PCBs), used as heat exchange fluids, in electrical transformers, and capacitors, and as additives in paint, carbonless copy paper, and plastics. Persistence varies with degree of halogenation, an estimated half-life of 10 years. PCBs are toxic to fish at high doses, and associated with spawning failure at low doses. Human exposure occurs through food, and is associated with reproductive failure and immune suppression. Immediate effects of PCB exposure include pigmentation of nails and mucous membranes and swelling of the eyelids, along with fatigue, nausea, and vomiting. Effects are transgenerational, as the chemical can persist in a mother's body for up to 7 years, resulting in developmental delays and behavioral problems in her children. Food contamination has led to large scale PCB exposure.
10. Dichlorodiphenyltrichloroethane (DDT) is probably the most infamous POP. It was widely used as insecticide during WWII to protect against malaria and typhus. After the war, DDT was used as an agricultural insecticide. In 1962, the American biologist Rachel Carson published Silent Spring, describing the impact of DDT spraying on the US environment and human health. DDT's persistence in the soil for up to 10–15 years after application has resulted in widespread and persistent DDT residues throughout the world including the arctic, even though it has been banned or severely restricted in most of the world. DDT is toxic to many organisms including birds where it is detrimental to reproduction due to eggshell thinning. DDT can be detected in foods from all over the world and food-borne DDT remains the greatest source of human exposure. Short-term acute effects of DDT on humans are limited, however long-term exposure has been associated with chronic health effects including increased risk of cancer and diabetes, reduced reproductive success, and neurological disease.
11. Dioxins are unintentional by-products of high-temperature processes, such as incomplete combustion and pesticide production. Dioxins are typically emitted from the burning of hospital waste, municipal waste, and hazardous waste, along with automobile emissions, peat, coal, and wood. Dioxins have been associated with several adverse effects in humans, including immune and enzyme disorders, chloracne, and are classified as a possible human carcinogen. In laboratory studies of dioxin effects an increase in birth defects and stillbirths, and lethal exposure have been associated with the substances. Food, particularly from animals, is the principal source of human exposure to dioxins. Dioxins were present in Agent Orange, which was used by the United States in chemical warfare against Vietnam and caused devastating multi-generational effects in both Vietnamese and American civilians.
12. Polychlorinated dibenzofurans are by-products of high-temperature processes, such as incomplete combustion after waste incineration or in automobiles, pesticide production, and polychlorinated biphenyl production. Structurally similar to dioxins, the two compounds share toxic effects. Furans persist in the environment and classified as possible human carcinogens. Human exposure to furans primarily results from food, particularly animal products.

=== New POPs on the Stockholm Convention list ===
Since 2001, this list has been expanded to include some polycyclic aromatic hydrocarbons (PAHs), brominated flame retardants, and other compounds. Additions to the initial 2001 Stockholm Convention list are the following POPs:

- α-Hexachlorocyclohexane (α-HCH) and β-Hexachlorocyclohexane (β-HCH) are insecticides as well as by-products in the production of lindane. α-HCH and β-HCH are highly persistent in the water of colder regions. α-HCH and β-HCH have been linked to Parkinson's and Alzheimer's disease.
- Chlorpyrifos (added in 2025 in the Stockholm Convention) is an Organophosphate, a pesticide, capable of inhibiting Acetylcholine esterase in synapse, leading to muscle tetanus, and death of the organism.
- Chlordecone is primarily used as an agricultural pesticide, related to DDT and Mirex. Chlordecone is toxic to aquatic organisms, and classified as a possible human carcinogen. Many countries have banned chlordecone sale and use, or intend to destroy stockpiles.
- Decabromodiphenyl ether, a flame retardant, commonly sold as decaBDE, which is added to polymers, textiles, adhesives, coatings and more. In addition to bioaccumulation potential, the Stockholm convention identified decaBDE as affecting human endocrine, reproductive, and nervous systems.
- Dechlorane plus is a flame retardant structurally similar to Mirex. Added to the Stockholm Convention in 2023, research into human toxicology is ongoing.
- Dicofol is a pesticide structurally similar to DDT and is highly toxic to fish, birds, aquatic invertebrates, and algae. Prolonged exposure in humans causes skin irritation.
- Hexabromodiphenyl is a flame retardant and possible human carcinogen. Like the related chemicals hexaBDE, heptaBDE, and octaBDE (see below), hexabromodiphenyl is an endocrine disruptor.
- Hexabromocyclododecane is a flame retardant predominately used in foams and textiles that is highly toxic to aquatic organisms. Human toxicology studies are ongoing, but it shows neuroendocrine disruption and developmental toxicity in animal studies.
- Hexabromodiphenyl ether (hexaBDE) and heptabromodiphenyl ether (heptaBDE) are main components of the flame retardant octabromodiphenyl ether (octaBDE). Commercial octaBDE is highly persistent in the environment, whose only degradation pathway is through debromination and the production of bromodiphenyl ethers, which themselves can be toxic.
- Hexachlorobutadiene (HCBD) is a byproduct of the production of other chlorinated compounds. HCBD is a possible human carcinogen and causes renal damage.
- Lindane (γ-hexachlorocyclohexane), a pesticide used as a broad spectrum insecticide for seed, soil, leaf, tree and wood treatment, and against ectoparasites in animals and humans (head lice and scabies). Lindane undergoes rapid biomagnification and is immunotoxic, neurotoxic, carcinogenic, linked to liver and kidney damage as well as adverse reproductive and developmental effects in various laboratory animals. Production of lindane unintentionally produces two other POPs α-HCH and β-HCH.
- Methoxychlor is a pesticide structurally similar to DDT. In addition to persistence, ecological mobility, and bioaccumulation risk, it also is a human endocrine disruptor.
- Medium-chain chlorinated paraffins are flame retardants, with 14 to 17 carbon atoms. It has been added in the Stockholm Convention in 2025.
- Pentachlorobenzene (PeCB), is a pesticide and unintentional byproduct. PeCB has also been used in PCB products, dyestuff carriers, as a fungicide, a flame retardant, and a chemical intermediate. This compound is moderately toxic to humans, whilst being highly toxic to aquatic organisms.
- Perfluorooctanesulfonic acid (PFOS) and related compounds are extremely persistent and readily biomagnify.
- Endosulfans are a group of chlorinated insecticides used to control pests on crops such coffee, cotton, rice and sorghum and soybeans, tsetse flies, ectoparasites of cattle. They are used as a wood preservative. Global use and manufacturing of endosulfan has been banned under the Stockholm convention in 2011, although many countries had previously banned or introduced phase-outs of the chemical when the ban was announced. Toxic to humans and aquatic and terrestrial organisms, linked to congenital physical disorders, intellectual disability, and death. Endosulfans' negative health effects are primarily liked to its endocrine disrupting capacity acting as an antiandrogen.
- Tetrabromodiphenyl ether (tetraBDE) and pentabromodiphenyl ether (pentaBDE) are industrial chemicals and the main components of commercial pentabromodiphenyl ether (pentaBDE). This pair of molecules have been detected in humans in all regions of the world.

== Health effects ==
POP exposure may cause developmental defects, chronic illnesses, and death. Some are carcinogens per IARC, possibly including breast cancer. Many POPs are capable of endocrine disruption within the reproductive system, the central nervous system, or the immune system. People and animals are exposed to POPs mostly through their diet, occupationally, or while growing in the womb. For humans not exposed to POPs through accidental or occupational means, over 90% of exposure comes from animal product foods due to bioaccumulation in fat tissues and bioaccumulate through the food chain. In general, POP serum levels increase with age and tend to be higher in females than males.

Studies have investigated the correlation between low level exposure of POPs and various diseases. In order to assess disease risk due to POPs in a particular location, government agencies may produce a human health risk assessment which takes into account the pollutants' bioavailability and their dose-response relationships.

=== Endocrine disruption ===
The majority of POPs are known to disrupt normal functioning of the endocrine system. Low level exposure to POPs during critical developmental periods of fetus, newborn and child can have a lasting effect throughout their lifespan. A 2002 study summarizes data on endocrine disruption and health complications from exposure to POPs during critical developmental stages in an organism's lifespan. The study aimed to answer the question whether or not chronic, low level exposure to POPs can have a health impact on the endocrine system and development of organisms from different species. The study found that exposure of POPs during a critical developmental time frame can produce a permanent changes in the organisms path of development. Exposure of POPs during non-critical developmental time frames may not lead to detectable diseases and health complications later in their life. In wildlife, the critical development time frames are in utero, in ovo, and during reproductive periods. In humans, the critical development timeframe is during fetal development.

=== Reproductive system ===
The same study in 2002 with evidence of a link from POPs to endocrine disruption also linked low dose exposure of POPs to reproductive health effects. The study stated that POP exposure can lead to negative health effects especially in the male reproductive system, such as decreased sperm quality and quantity, altered sex ratio and early puberty onset. For females exposed to POPs, altered reproductive tissues and pregnancy outcomes as well as endometriosis have been reported.

==== Gestational weight gain and newborn head circumference ====
A Greek study from 2014 investigated the link between maternal weight gain during pregnancy, their PCB-exposure level and PCB level in their newborn infants, their birth weight, gestational age, and head circumference. The lower the birth weight and head circumference of the infants was, the higher POP levels during prenatal development had been, but only if mothers had either excessive or inadequate weight gain during pregnancy. No correlation between POP exposure and gestational age was found. A 2013 case-control study conducted 2009 in Indian mothers and their offspring showed prenatal exposure of two types of organochlorine pesticides (HCH, DDT and DDE) impaired the growth of the fetus, reduced the birth weight, length, head circumference and chest circumference.

=== Additive and synergistic effects ===
Evaluation of the effects of POPs on health is very challenging in the laboratory setting. For example, for organisms exposed to a mixture of POPs, the effects are assumed to be additive. Mixtures of POPs can in principle produce synergistic effects. With synergistic effects, the toxicity of each compound is enhanced (or depressed) by the presence of other compounds in the mixture. When put together, the effects can far exceed the approximated additive effects of the POP compound mixture.

== In urban areas and indoor environments ==
Traditionally it was thought that human exposure to POPs occurred primarily through food, however indoor pollution patterns that characterize certain POPs have challenged this notion. Recent studies of indoor dust and air have implicated indoor environments as a major sources for human exposure via inhalation and ingestion. Furthermore, the impact of indoor POP pollution is exacerbated by the modern trend toward spending larger proportions of life indoors. Several studies have shown that indoor (air and dust) POP levels frequently exceed outdoor (air and soil) POP concentrations.

== In rainwater ==
In 2022, levels of at least four perfluoroalkyl acids (PFAAs) in rain water worldwide greatly exceeded the EPA's lifetime drinking water health advisories as well as comparable Danish, Dutch, and European Union safety standards, leading to the conclusion that "the global spread of these four PFAAs in the atmosphere has led to the planetary boundary for chemical pollution being exceeded". The most common PFAS found in the environment is Trifluoroacetic acid (TFA). Its presence is ubiquitous in the environment, especially in aquatic ecosystems, where it persists with increasing concentrations globally.

It had been thought that PFAAs would eventually end up in the oceans, where they would be diluted over decades, but a field study published in 2021 by researchers at Stockholm University found that they are often transferred from water to air when waves reach land, are a significant source of air pollution, and eventually get into rain. The researchers concluded that pollution may impact large areas. Soil is also contaminated and the chemicals have been found in remote areas such as Antarctica. Soil contamination can result in higher levels of PFAS found in foods such as white rice, coffee, and animals reared on contaminated ground. In 2024, a worldwide study of 45,000 groundwater samples found that 31% of samples contained levels of PFAS that were harmful to human health; these samples were taken from areas not near any obvious source of contamination.

Contamination has also been seen in water wells and other sources of drinking water. This contamination is seen in US, United Kingdom, Germany, Japan, and Canada, but information from most developing countries is nearly nonexistent. The lack of information on PFAS contamination in developing countries, especially those in Africa, are due to structural socioeconomic inequality and lack of access to the expensive laboratory capabilities required for PFAS quantification.

== Control and removal in the environment ==
Current studies aimed at minimizing POPs in the environment are investigating their behavior in photocatalytic oxidation reactions. POPs that are found in humans and in aquatic environments the most are the main subjects of these experiments. Aromatic and aliphatic degradation products have been identified in these reactions. Photochemical degradation is negligible compared to photocatalytic degradation. A method of removal of POPs from marine environments that has been explored is adsorption. It occurs when an absorbable solute comes into contact with a solid with a porous surface structure. This technique was investigated by Mohamed Nageeb Rashed of Aswan University, Egypt. Current efforts are more focused on banning the use and production of POPs worldwide rather than removal of POPs.

== See also ==
- Aarhus Protocol on Persistent Organic Pollutants
- Biogeochemical Cycles of Anthropogenic Contaminants
- Center for International Environmental Law (CIEL)
- International POPs Elimination Network (IPEN)
- Silent Spring
- Environmental Persistent Pharmaceutical Pollutant (EPPP)
- Persistent, bioaccumulative and toxic substances (PBT)
- Tetraethyllead
- Triclocarban
- Triclosan
