= Chlordecone reductase =

Class of enzymes

chlordecone reductase
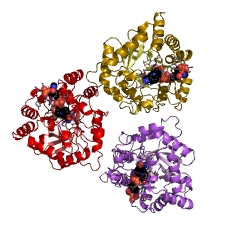

Identifiers
- EC no.: 1.1.1.225
- CAS no.: 102484-73-1

Databases
- IntEnz: IntEnz view
- BRENDA: BRENDA entry
- ExPASy: NiceZyme view
- KEGG: KEGG entry
- MetaCyc: metabolic pathway
- PRIAM: profile
- PDB structures: RCSB PDB PDBe PDBsum
- Gene Ontology: AmiGO / QuickGO
Search
- PMC: articles
- PubMed: articles
- NCBI: proteins

In enzymology, a chlordecone reductase (EC 1.1.1.225) is an enzyme that catalyzes the chemical reaction

chlordecone alcohol + NADP^{+} $\rightleftharpoons$ chlordecone + NADPH + H^{+}

Thus, the two substrates of this enzyme are chlordecone alcohol and NADP^{+}, whereas its 3 products are chlordecone, NADPH, and H^{+}.

This enzyme belongs to the family of oxidoreductases, specifically those acting on the CH-OH group of donor with NAD^{+} or NADP^{+} as acceptor. The systematic name of this enzyme class is chlordecone-alcohol:NADP^{+} 2-oxidoreductase. This enzyme is also called CDR.

== Structural studies ==
As of late 2007, only one structure has been solved for this class of enzymes, with the PDB accession code 2FVL.
