= Hexabromocyclododecane =

Names
- Preferred IUPAC name 1,2,5,6,9,10-Hexabromocyclododecane
- Other names Hexabromocyclododecane

Identifiers
CAS Number	3194-55-6
3D model (JSmol)	Interactive image
Abbreviations	HBCDD; HBCD
ChEBI	CHEBI:134063
ChEMBL	ChEMBL375298
ChemSpider	17499
ECHA InfoCard	100.019.724
EC Number	221-695-9
PubChem CID	18529
UNII	66OON1WWOS
CompTox Dashboard (EPA)	DTXSID4027527
- InChI: InChI=1S/C12H18Br6/c13-7-1-2-8(14)10(16)5-6-12(18)11(17)4-3-9(7)15/h7-12H,1-6H2 Key: DEIGXXQKDWULML-UHFFFAOYSA-N
- SMILES: C1(Br)C(Br)CCC(Br)C(Br)CCC(Br)C(Br)CC1

Properties
Chemical formula	C_{12}H_{18}Br_{6}
Molar mass	641.7 g/mol
Melting point	186 °C (367 °F; 459 K) (175–195 °C, depending upon isomer)
Solubility in water	3.4 µg/L in water

Hazards
- GHS labelling
Pictograms	(GHS06: Toxic) (GHS08: Health hazard) (GHS09: Environmental hazard)
Signal word	Warning
Hazard statements	H315, H319, H335, H361, H362, H410
Precautionary statements	P201, P202, P260, P263, P264, P270, P271, P273, P280, P281, P302+P352, P304+P340, P305+P351+P338, P308+P313, P312, P321, P332+P313, P337+P313, P362, P391, P403+P233, P405, P501
NFPA 704 (fire diamond)	2 1 0
- Except where otherwise noted, data are given for materials in their standard state (at 25 °C [77 °F], 100 kPa). verify (what is ?) Infobox references

Hexabromocyclododecane (HBCD or HBCDD) is a brominated flame retardant. It consists of twelve carbon, eighteen hydrogen, and six bromine atoms tied to the ring. Its primary application is in extruded (XPS) and expanded (EPS) polystyrene foam used as thermal insulation in construction. Other uses are upholstered furniture, automobile interior textiles, car cushions and insulation blocks in trucks, packaging material, video cassette recorder housing, and electric and electronic equipment. According to UNEP, "HBCD is produced in China, Europe, Japan, and the USA. The last known current annual production is approximately 28,000 tonnes per year. The main share of the market volume is used in Europe and China" (figures from 2009 to 2010). Due to hexabromocyclododecane's persistence, long-range environmental transport, toxicity and ecotoxicity, the Stockholm Convention on Persistent Organic Pollutants lists it in Annex A to the convention with exemptions for production and use in expanded polystyrene and extruded polystyrene in buildings. It is synthesized via the bromination of cyclododecatriene.

== Occurrence ==
HBCD has been found widely in biological samples from remote areas and supporting pieces of evidence for its classification as Persistent, Bioaccumulative, and Toxic (PBT) and undergoes long-range environmental transport.

As of 2012, there was a large and still increasing stock of HBCD in the anthroposphere, mainly in EPS and XPS insulation boards. A long-term environmental monitoring program run by the Fraunhofer Institute for Molecular Biology and Applied Ecology demonstrates a general trend that HBCD concentrations are decreasing over time. HBCD emissions into the environment are limited under the voluntary industry emission management program: the Voluntary Emissions Control Action Programme (VECAP). The VECAP annual report demonstrated a continuous decrease of potential emissions of HBCD to the environment in Europe.

== Properties ==
HBCD has 16 possible stereo-isomers, each with distinct biological activities. The HBCD commercial mixture is composed of three main diastereomers denoted as alpha (α-HBCD), beta (β-HBCD), and gamma (γ-HBCD) with traces of others. A series of four published in vivo mice studies were conducted between several federal and academic institutions to characterize the toxicokinetic profiles of individual HBCD stereoisomers. The predominant diastereomer in the HBCD mixture, γ-HBCD, undergoes rapid hepatic metabolism, fecal and urinary elimination, and biological conversion to other diastereomers with a short biological half-life of 1–4 days. After oral exposure to the γ-HBCD diastereomer, β-HBCD was detected in the liver and brain, and α-HBCD and β-HBCD was detected in the fat and feces with multiple novel metabolites identified - monohydroxy-pentabromocyclododecane, monohydroxy-pentabromocyclododecene, dihydroxy-pentabromocyclododecene, and dihydroxy-pentabromocyclododecadiene. In contrast, α-HBCD is more biologically persistent, resistant to metabolism, bioaccumulates in lipid-rich tissues after a 10-day repeated exposure study, and has a longer biological half-life of up to 21 days; only α-HBCD was detected in the liver, brain, fat and feces with no stereoisomerization to γ-HBCD or β-HBCD and low trace levels of four different hydroxylated metabolites were identified. Developing mice had higher HBCD tissue levels than adult mice after exposure to either α-HBCD or γ-HBCD indicating the potential for increased susceptibility of the developing young to HBCD effects. The reported toxicokinetic differences of individual HBCD diastereoisomers have important implications for the extrapolation of toxicological studies of the commercial HBCD mixture to the assessment of human risk.

Structures of the six (out of 16 possible) hexabromocyclododecane isomers that are present in the technical product at > 1 %

== Regulation ==
Due to its PBT properties, on 28 October 2008, the European Chemicals Agency decided to include HBCD in the SVHC list, Substances of Very High Concern, within the Registration, Evaluation, Authorisation and Restriction of Chemicals framework. On 18 February 2011, HBCD was listed in Annex XIV of REACH and hence is subject to Authorisation. HBCD could be used until the so-called “sunset date” (21 August 2015). After that date, only authorized applications was allowed in the EU. HBCD has been classified as a category 2 for reproductive toxicity.

Since August 2010 hexabromocyclododecanes are included in the EPA's List of Chemicals of Concern. Japan was the first country to implement a ban on the import and production of HBCD effective in May 2014. The United States EPA began the process of regulating HBCD in 2020 releasing it final evaluation of the chemicals and confirmed its health and environmental risks in 2022.

Due to its persistence, toxicity/ecotoxicity and long-range environmental transport, the Stockholm Convention on Persistent Organic Pollutants decided in May 2013 to list hexabromocyclododecane in Annex A to the convention with an exemption for use in polystyrene insulation that was set to end in 2019. The listing entered in force on 26 November 2014 for most countries. Countries could choose to use this exemption for up to five years after the entry into force. This possibility was used by a number of countries.

As the United States has not ratified the Stockholm Convention, HBCD was not banned in the US though the EPA claimed it was no longer manufactured or imported as of 2019. In 2020, the US EPA updated their assessment of HBCD stating it posed an unreasonable risk to workers and in 2022 expanded the risk assessment to encompass the general population and the environment.
