= Persistent, bioaccumulative and toxic substances =

Class of chemical compounds

Persistent, bioaccumulative and toxic substances (PBTs) are a class of compounds that have high resistance to degradation from abiotic and biotic factors, high mobility in the environment and high toxicity. Because of these factors PBTs have been observed to have a high order of bioaccumulation and biomagnification, very long retention times in various media, and widespread distribution across the globe. Most PBTs in the environment are either created through industry or are unintentional byproducts.

== History ==
Persistent organic pollutants (POPs) were the focal point of the Stockholm Convention 2001 due to their persistence, ability to biomagnify and the threat posed to both human health and the environment. The goal of the Stockholm Convention was to determine the classification of POPs, create measures to eliminate production/use of POPs, and establish proper disposal of the compounds in an environmentally friendly manner. Currently the majority of the global community is actively involved with this program but a few still resist, most notably the US.

Similar to POPs classification, the PBT classification of chemicals was developed in 1997 by the Great Lakes Binational Toxic Strategy (GLBNS). Signed by both the US and Canada, the GLBNS classified PBTs in one of two categories, level I and level II. Level I PBTs are top priority which currently, as of 2005, contained 12 compounds or classes of compounds.

Level I PBTs (GLBNS)

- Mercury
- Polychlorinated biphenyls (PCBs)
- Dioxins/furans
- Benzo(a)pyrene (BaP)
- Hexachlorobenzene (HCB)
- Alkyl-lead
- Pesticides
  - Mirex
  - Dieldrin/aldrin
  - Chlordane
  - Toxaphene
- Octachlorostyrene

The GLBNS is administered by the U.S Environmental Protection Agency (USEPA) and Environment Canada. Following the GLBNS, the Multimedia Strategy for Priority Persistent, Bioaccumulative and Toxic Pollutants (PBT Strategy) was drafted by the USEPA. The PBT Strategy led to the implementation of PBT criteria in several regulational policies. Two main policies that were changed by the PBT strategy were the Toxics Release Inventory (TRI), which required more rigid chemical reporting, and the New Chemical Program (NCP) under the Toxics Substances Control Act (TSCA), which required screening for PBTs and PBT properties.

== Compounds ==
=== General ===
PBTs are a unique classification of chemicals that have and will continue to impact human health and the environment worldwide. The three main attributes of a PBT (persistence, bioaccumulative and toxic) each have a huge role in the risk posed by these compounds.

=== Persistence ===
PBTs may have a high environmental mobility relative to other contaminants mainly due to their resistance to degradation (persistence). This allows PBTs to travel far and wide in both the atmosphere and in aqueous environments. The low degradation rates of PBTs allow these chemicals to be exposed to both biotic and abiotic factors while maintaining a relatively stable concentration. Another factor that makes PBTs especially dangerous are the degradation products which are often relatively as toxic as the parent compound. These factors have resulted in global contamination, most notably in remote areas such as the arctic and high elevation areas, which are far from any source of PBTs.

=== Bioaccumulation and biomagnification ===
The bioaccumulative ability of PBTs follows suit with the persistence attribute by the high resistance to degradation by biotic factors, especially with in organisms. Bioaccumulation is the result of a toxic substance being taken up at a higher rate than being removed from an organism. For PBTs this is caused mainly by a resistance to degradation, biotic and abiotic. PBTs usually are highly insoluble in water which allows them to enter organisms at faster rates through fats and other nonpolar regions on an organism. Bioaccumulation of a toxicant can lead to biomagnification through a trophic web which has resulted in massive concern in areas with especially low trophic diversity. Biomagnification results in higher trophic organisms accumulating more PBTs than those of lower trophic levels through consumption of the PBT contaminated lower trophic organisms.

=== Toxicity ===
The toxicity of this class of compounds is high, with very low concentrations of a PBT required to enact an effect on an organism compared to most other contaminants. This high toxicity along with the persistence allows for the PBT to have detrimental effects in remote areas around the globe where there is not a local source of PBTs. The bioaccumulation and magnification along with the high toxicity and persistence has the ability to destroy and/or irreparably damage trophic systems, especially the higher trophic levels, globally. For this reason, PBTs have become an area of focus in global politics.

=== Specific toxicants ===
==== PCBs ====
Historically, PCBs were used extensively for industrial purposes such as coolants, insulating fluids, and as a plasticizer. These contaminants enter the environment through both use and disposal. Due to extensive concern from the public, legal, and scientific sectors indicating that PCBs are likely carcinogens and potential to adversely impact the environment, these compounds were banned in 1979 in the United States. The ban included the use of PCBs in uncontained sources, such as adhesives, fire retardant fabric treatments, and plasticizers in paints and cements. Containers that are completely enclosed, such as transformers and capacitors are exempt from the ban.

The inclusion of PCBs as a PBT may be attributed to their low water solubility, high stability, and semi-volatility facilitating their long range transport and accumulation in organisms. The persistence of these compounds is due to the high resistance to oxidation, reduction, addition, elimination and electrophilic substitution. The toxicological interactions of PCBs are affected by the number and position of the chlorine atoms, without ortho substitution are referred as coplanar and all others as non-coplanar. Non-coplanar PCBs may cause neurotoxicity by interfering with intracellular signal transduction dependent on calcium. Ortho-PCBs may alter hormone regulation through disruption of the thyroid hormone transport by binding to transthyretin. Coplanar PCBs are similar to dioxins and furans, both bind to the aryl hydrocarbon receptor (AhR) in organisms and may exert dioxin-like effects, in addition to the effects shared with non-coplanar PCBs. The AhR is a transcription factor, therefore, abnormal activation may disrupt cellular function by altering gene transcription.

Effects of PBTs may include increase in disease, lesions in benthic feeders, spawning loss, change in age-structured populations of fish, and tissue contamination in fish and shellfish. Humans and other organisms, which consume shellfish and/or fish contaminated with persistent bioaccumulative pollutants, have the potential to bioaccumulate these chemicals. This may put these organisms at risk of mutagenic, teratogenic, and/or carcinogenic effects. Correlations have been found between elevated exposure to PCB mixtures and alterations in liver enzymes, hepatomegaly, and dermatological effects such as rashes have been reported.

==== DDT ====
One PBT of concern is DDT (dichlorodiphenyltrichloroethane), an organochlorine that was widely used as an insecticide during World War II to protect soldiers from malaria carried by mosquitoes. Due to the low cost and low toxicity to mammals, the widespread use of DDT for agricultural and commercial motives started around 1940. However, the overuse of DDT lead to insect tolerance to the chemical. It was also discovered that DDT had a high toxicity to fish. DDT was banned in the US by 1973 because of building evidence that DDT's stable structure, high fat solubility, and low rate of metabolism caused it to bioaccumulate in animals. While DDT is banned in the US, other countries such as China and Turkey still produce and use it quite regularly through Dicofol, an insecticide that has DDT as an impurity. This continued use in other parts of the world is still a global problem due to the mobility and persistence of DDT.

The initial contact from DDT is on vegetation and soil. From here, the DDT can travel many routes; for instance, when plants and vegetation are exposed to the chemical to protect from insects, the plants may absorb it. Then these plants may either be consumed by humans or other animals. These consumers ingest the chemical and begin metabolizing the toxicant, accumulating more through ingestion, and posing health risks to the organism, their offspring, and any predators. Alternatively, the ingestion of the contaminated plant by insects may lead to tolerance by the organism. Another route is the chemical travelling through the soil and ending up in ground water and in human water supply. In the case that the soil is near a moving water system, the chemical could end up in large freshwater systems or the ocean, where fish are at high risk from the toxicological effects of DDT. Lastly, the most common transport route is the evaporation of DDT into the atmosphere followed by condensation and eventually precipitation where it is released into environments anywhere on earth. Due to the long-range transport of DDT, the presence of this harmful toxicant will continue as long as it is still used anywhere and until the current contamination eventually degrades. Even after its complete discontinued use, it will still remain in the environment for many more years after because of DDT's persistent attributes.

Previous studies have shown that DDT and other similar chemicals directly elicited a response and effect from excitable membranes. DDT causes membranes such as sense organs and nerves endings to activate repetitively by slowing down the ability for the sodium channel to close and stop releasing sodium ions. The sodium ions are what polarize the opposing synapse after it has depolarized from firing. This inhibition of closing the sodium ion channel can lead to a variety of problems including a dysfunctional nervous system, decreased motor abilities/function/control, reproductive impairment (egg-shell thinning in birds), and development deficiencies. Presently, DDT has been labeled as a possible human carcinogen based on animal liver tumor studies. DDT toxicity on humans have been associated with dizziness, tremors, irritability, and convulsions. Chronic toxicity has led to long term neurological and cognitive issues.

==== Mercury ====
Inorganic

Inorganic mercury (elemental mercury) is less bioavailable and less toxic than that of organic mercury but is still toxic, nonetheless. It is released into the environment through both natural sources as well as human activity, and it has the capability to travel long distances through the atmosphere. Around 2,700 to 6,000 tons of elemental mercury are released via natural activity such as volcanoes and erosion. Another 2,000–3,000 tons are released by human industrial activities such as coal combustion, metal smelting and cement production. Due to its high volatility and atmospheric residence time of around one year, mercury has the ability to travel across continents before being deposited. Inorganic mercury has a wide spectrum of toxicological effects that include damage to the respiratory, nervous, immune and excretory systems in humans. Inorganic mercury also possesses the ability to bioaccumulate individuals and biomagnify through trophic systems.

Organic

Organic mercury is significantly more detrimental to the environment than its inorganic form due to its widespread distribution as well as its higher mobility, general toxicity and rates of bioaccumulation than that of the inorganic form. Environmental organic mercury is mainly created by the transformation of elemental (inorganic) mercury via anaerobic bacteria into methylated mercury (organic). The global distribution of organic mercury is the result of general mobility of the compound, activation via bacteria and transportation from animal consumption. Organic mercury shares a lot of the same effects as the inorganic form but it has a higher toxicity due to its higher mobility in the body, especially its ability to readily move across the blood brain barrier.

Ecological Impact of Hg

The high toxicity of both forms of mercury (especially organic mercury) poses a threat to almost all organisms that comes in contact with it. This is one of the reasons that there is such high attention to mercury in the environment but even more so than its toxicity is both its persistence and atmospheric retention times. The ability of mercury to readily volatilize allows it to enter the atmosphere and travel far and wide. Unlike most other PBTs that have atmospheric half-lives between 30 min and 7 days mercury has an atmospheric residence time of at least 1 year. This atmospheric retention time along with mercury's resistance to degradation factors such as electromagnetic radiation and oxidation, which are two of the main factors leading to degradation of many PBTs in the atmosphere, allows mercury from any source to be transported extensively. This characteristic of mercury transportation globally along with its high toxicity is the reasoning behind its incorporation into the BNS list of PBTs.

== Notable PBT environmental impacts ==
=== Japan ===
The realization of the adverse effects from environmental pollution were made public from several disasters that occurred globally. In 1965, it was recognized that extensive mercury pollution by the Chisso chemical factory in Minamata, Japan due to improper handling of industrial wastes resulted in significant effects to the humans and organisms exposed. Mercury was released into the environment as methyl mercury (bioavailable state) into industrial wastewater and was then bioaccumulated by shellfish and fish in Minamata Bay and the Shiranui Sea. When the contaminated seafood was consumed by the local populace it caused a neurological syndrome, coined Minamata disease. Symptoms include general muscle weakness, hearing damage, reduced field of vision, and ataxia. The Minamata disaster contributed to the global realization of the potential dangers from environmental pollution and to the characterization of PBTs.

=== Puget Sound ===
Despite the ban on DDT 30 years earlier and years of various efforts to clean up Puget Sound from DDT and PCBs, there is still a significant presence of both compounds which pose a constant threat to human health and the environment. Harbor seals (Phoca vitulina), a common marine species in the Puget Sound area, have been the focus of a few studies to monitor and examine the effects of DDT accumulation and magnification in aquatic wildlife. One study tagged and reexamined seal pups every 4 to 5 years to be tested for DDT concentrations. The trends showed the pups to be highly contaminated; this means their prey are also highly contaminated. Due to DDT's high lipid solubility, it also has the ability to accumulate in the local populace who consume seafood from the area. This also translates to women who are pregnant or breastfeeding, since DDT will be transferred from the mother to child. Both animal and human health risk to DDT will continue to be an issue in Puget Sound especially because of the cultural significance of fish in this region.

== See also ==
- Persistent organic pollutant
