= Methoxychlor =

Synthetic organochloride insecticide

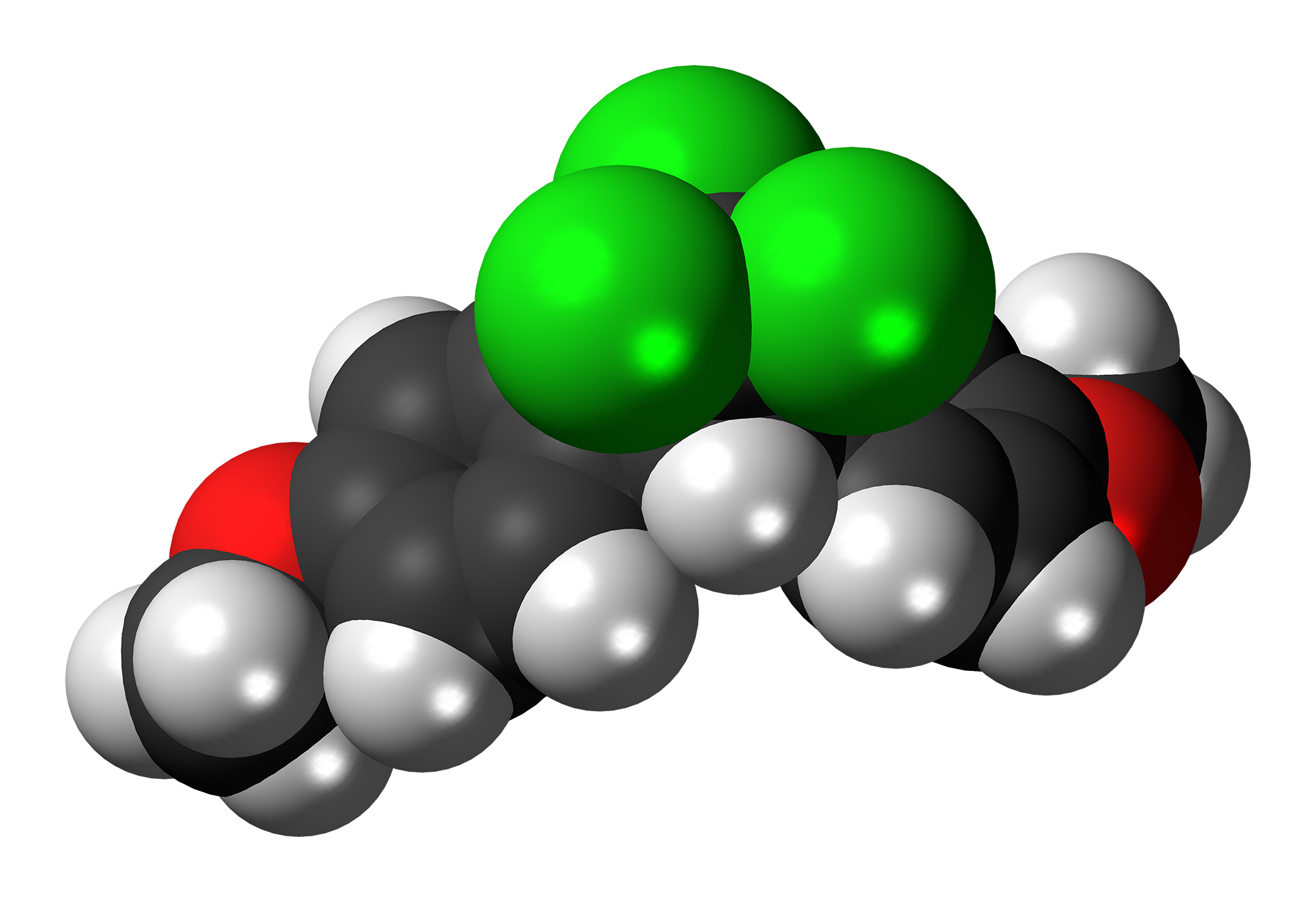

Names
- Preferred IUPAC name 1,1′-(2,2,2-Trichloroethane-1,1-diyl)bis(4-methoxybenzene)
- Other names Methoxcide; Dimethoxy-DDT; Methoxy-DDT p,p'-Dimethoxydiphenyltrichloroethane

Identifiers
CAS Number	72-43-5
3D model (JSmol)	Interactive image
Abbreviations	DMDT
ChEBI	CHEBI:6842
ChEMBL	ChEMBL362919
ChemSpider	3972
ECHA InfoCard	100.000.709
KEGG	C11043
PubChem CID	4115
UNII	RIA79UD69L
CompTox Dashboard (EPA)	DTXSID9020827
- InChI: InChI=1S/C16H15Cl3O2/c1-20-13-7-3-11(4-8-13)15(16(17,18)19)12-5-9-14(21-2)10-6-12/h3-10,15H,1-2H3 Key: IAKOZHOLGAGEJT-UHFFFAOYSA-N; InChI=1/C16H15Cl3O2/c1-20-13-7-3-11(4-8-13)15(16(17,18)19)12-5-9-14(21-2)10-6-12/h3-10,15H,1-2H3 Key: IAKOZHOLGAGEJT-UHFFFAOYAO
- SMILES: ClC(Cl)(Cl)C(c1ccc(OC)cc1)c2ccc(OC)cc2

Properties
Chemical formula	C_{16}H_{15}Cl_{3}O_{2}
Molar mass	345.65 g/mol
Appearance	Colorless to light-yellow crystals
Odor	Slight, fruity odor
Density	1.41 g/cm^{3} (20°C)
Melting point	87 °C (189 °F; 360 K)
Boiling point	decomposes
Solubility in water	0.00001% (20°C)

Hazards
- Lethal dose or concentration (LD, LC)
LD_{50} (median dose)	5000 mg/kg (oral, rat); 1000 mg/kg (oral, mouse) >6000 mg/kg (oral, rabbit)
- NIOSH (US health exposure limits)
PEL (Permissible)	TWA 15 mg/m^{3}
REL (Recommended)	Ca
IDLH (Immediate danger)	Ca [5000 mg/m^{3}]
- Except where otherwise noted, data are given for materials in their standard state (at 25 °C [77 °F], 100 kPa). verify (what is ?) Infobox references

Methoxychlor is a synthetic organochloride insecticide, now obsolete. Tradenames for methoxychlor include Chemform, Maralate, Methoxo, Methoxcide, Metox, and Moxie.

== Usage ==
Methoxychlor was used to protect crops, ornamentals, livestock, and pets against fleas, mosquitoes, cockroaches, and other insects. It was intended to be a replacement for DDT, but has since been banned for use as a pesticide based on its acute toxicity, bioaccumulation, and endocrine disruption activity.

The amount of methoxychlor in the environment changes seasonally due to its use in farming and foresting. It does not dissolve readily in water, so it is mixed with a petroleum-based fluid and sprayed, or used as a dust. Sprayed methoxychlor settles on the ground or in aquatic ecosystems, where it can be detected in sediments. Its degradation may take many months. Methoxychlor is ingested and absorbed by living organisms, and it accumulates in the food chain. Some metabolites may have unwanted side effects.

=== Banned ===
The use of methoxychlor as a pesticide was banned in the United States in 2003 and in the European Union in 2002.

== Health and environmental impacts ==
The EPA lists methoxychlor as "a persistent, bioaccumulative, and toxic (PBT) chemical by the EPA Toxics Release Inventory (TRI) program", and as such it is a waste minimization priority chemical. The 2023 Conference of the Parties of the United Nations Stockholm Convention on Persistent Organic Pollutants decided to eliminate the use of methoxychlor, by listing this chemical in Annex A to the Convention.

=== Human exposure ===
Human exposure to methoxychlor occurs via air, soil, and water, primarily in people who work with the substance or who are exposed to air, soil, or water that has been contaminated. It is unknown how quickly and efficiently the substance is absorbed by humans who have been exposed to contaminated air or via skin contact. In animal models, high doses can lead to neurotoxicity. Some methoxychlor's metabolites have estrogenic effects in adult and developing animals before and after birth. One studied metabolite is 2,2-bis(p-hydroxyphenyl)-1,1,1-trichloroethane (HPTE) which shows reproductive toxicity in an animal model by reducing testosterone biosynthesis. Such effects adversely affect both the male and female reproductive systems. It is expected that this "could occur in humans" but has not been proven. While one study has linked methoxychlor to the development of leukemia in humans, most studies in animals and humans have been negative, thus the EPA has determined that it is not classifiable as a carcinogen. The EPA indicates that levels above the Maximum Contaminant Level of 40 ppb "cause" central nervous depression, diarrhea, damage to liver, kidney, and heart, and - by chronic exposure - growth retardation.

Little information is available regarding effects on human pregnancy and children, but it is assumed from animals studies that methoxychlor crosses the placenta, and it has been detected in human milk Exposure to children may be different than in adults because they tend to play on the ground, further, their reproductive system may be more sensitive to the effects of methoxychlor as an endocrine disruptor.

Food contamination may occur at low levels and it is recommended to wash all foods. A number of hazardous waste sites are known to contain methoxychlor.

Maximum pesticide residue limits for the EU/UK are set at 0.01 mg/kg for oranges and 0.01 mg/kg for apples.

== See also ==
- Xenoestrogen
