= Chlordecone =

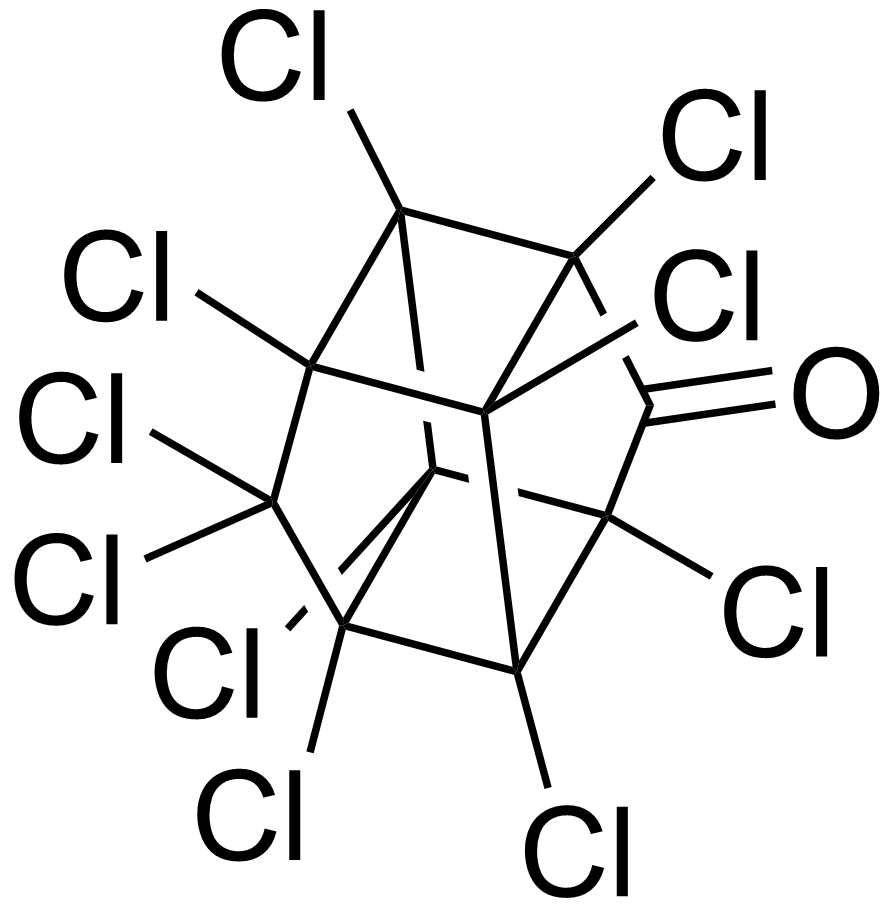

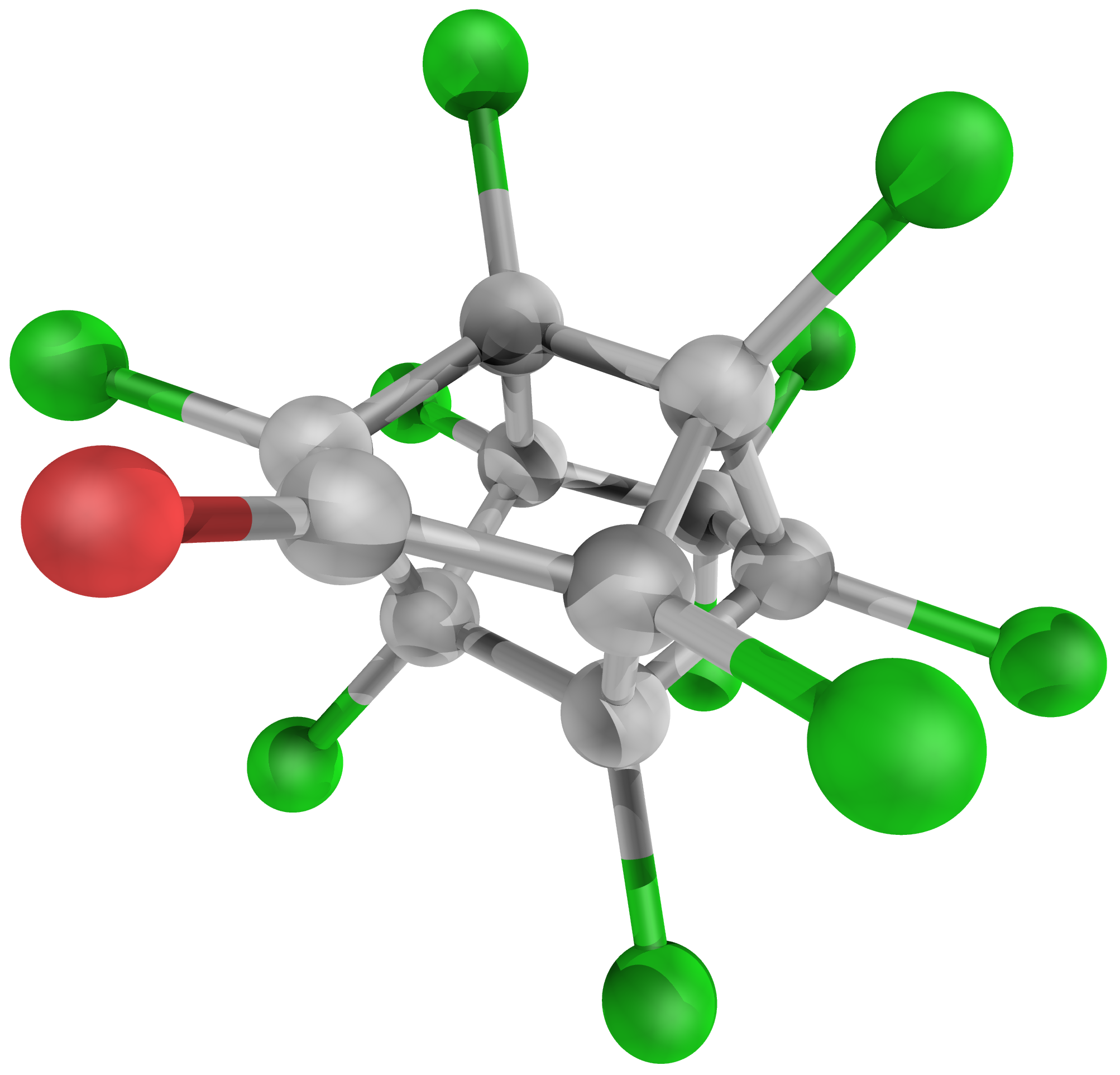

Names
- IUPAC name decachloropentacyclo[5.3.0.0^{2.6}.0^{3.9}.0^{4.8}]decan-5-one
- Other names Chlordecone; Clordecone; Merex; CAS name: 1,1a,3,3a,4,5,5,5a,5b,6-decachlorooctahydro-1,3,4-metheno-2H-cyclobuta[cd]pentalen-2-one

Identifiers
CAS Number	143-50-0
3D model (JSmol)	Interactive image
ChEBI	CHEBI:16548
ChEMBL	ChEMBL462576
ChemSpider	293
ECHA InfoCard	100.005.093
EC Number	205-601-3
KEGG	C01792
PubChem CID	299
UNII	RG5XJ88UDF
CompTox Dashboard (EPA)	DTXSID1020770
- InChI: InChI=1S/C10Cl10O/c11-2-1(21)3(12)6(15)4(2,13)8(17)5(2,14)7(3,16)9(6,18)10(8,19)20 Key: LHHGDZSESBACKH-UHFFFAOYSA-N; InChI=1/C10Cl10O/c11-2-1(21)3(12)6(15)4(2,13)8(17)5(2,14)7(3,16)9(6,18)10(8,19)20 Key: LHHGDZSESBACKH-UHFFFAOYAM
- SMILES: ClC54C(=O)C1(Cl)C2(Cl)C5(Cl)C3(Cl)C4(Cl)C1(Cl)C2(Cl)C3(Cl)Cl

Properties
Chemical formula	C_{10}Cl_{10}O
Molar mass	490.633 g/mol
Appearance	tan to white crystalline solid
Odor	odorless
Density	1.6 g/cm^{3}
Melting point	349 °C (660 °F; 622 K) (decomposes)
Solubility in water	0.27 g/100 mL
Solubility	soluble in acetone, ketone, acetic acid slightly soluble in benzene, hexane
log P	5.41
Vapor pressure	3.10^{−7} kPa

Thermochemistry
Std molar entropy (S^{⦵}_{298})	764 J/K mol
Std enthalpy of formation (Δ_{f}H^{⦵}_{298})	−225.9 kJ/mol

Hazards
- Occupational safety and health (OHS/OSH)
Main hazards	carcinogen
Flash point	Non-flammable
- Lethal dose or concentration (LD, LC)
LD_{50} (median dose)	95 mg/kg (rat, oral)
- NIOSH (US health exposure limits)
PEL (Permissible)	none
REL (Recommended)	Ca TWA 0.001 mg/m^{3}
IDLH (Immediate danger)	N.D.
- Except where otherwise noted, data are given for materials in their standard state (at 25 °C [77 °F], 100 kPa). verify (what is ?) Infobox references

Chlordecone, better known in the United States under the brand name Kepone, is an organochlorine compound and a colourless solid. It is an obsolete insecticide, now prohibited in the Western world, but only after many thousands of tonnes had been produced and used. Chlordecone is a known persistent organic pollutant that was banned globally by the Stockholm Convention on Persistent Organic Pollutants in 2009.

== Synthesis ==
Chlordecone is made by dimerizing hexachlorocyclopentadiene and hydrolyzing to a ketone.

It is also the main degradation product of mirex.

== History ==
In the U.S., chlordecone, commercialized under the brand name "Kepone", was produced by Allied Signal Company and LifeSciences Product Company in Hopewell, Virginia. The improper handling and dumping of the substance (including the waste materials generated in its manufacturing process) into the nearby James River (U.S.) in the 1960s and 1970s drew national attention to its toxic effects on humans and wildlife. After two physicians, Dr. Yi-nan Chou and Dr. Robert S. Jackson of the Virginia Health Department, notified the Centers for Disease Control that employees of the company had been found to have toxic chemical poisoning, LifeSciences closed its plant on 4 July 1975, and cleanup of the contamination began. A 100-mile section of the James River was closed to fishing while state health officials looked for other persons who might have been injured. At least 29 people in the area were hospitalized as a result of their exposure to Kepone.

The product is made in a Diels-Alder reaction shared with pesticides like chlordane and endosulfan. Chlordecone is cited amongst a handful of other noxious substances as the driver for Gerald Ford's approval of the Toxic Substances Control Act in 1976, a United States regulatory bill that was controversial due to the financial burden it put on chemical production companies to get approval for new compounds.

== Regulation ==
In the US, Chlordecone was not federally regulated until after the Hopewell disaster, in which 29 factory workers were hospitalized with various ailments, including neurological.

In France it was banned on the mainland only, in 1993.

In 2009, chlordecone was included in the Stockholm Convention on Persistent Organic Pollutants, which bans its production and use worldwide.

On 14 March 2024, the French National Assembly assumed responsibility for the chlordecone contamination affecting populations in Martinique and Guadeloupe.

== Toxicology ==
Chlordecone can accumulate in the liver and the distribution in the human body is regulated by binding of the pollutant or its metabolites to lipoproteins like LDL and HDL. The LC_{50} (LC = lethal concentration) is 35 μg/ L for Etroplus maculatus, 22–95 μg/kg for blue gill and trout. Chlordecone bioaccumulates in animals by factors up to a million-fold.

Workers with repeated exposure suffer severe convulsions resulting from degradation of the synaptic junctions.

Chronic low level exposure appears to cause prostate cancer in men, and "significant excesses of deaths were observed for stomach cancer in women and pancreatic cancer in women".

Chlordecone has been found to act as an agonist of the GPER (GPR30), which interacts strongly with the estrogen sex hormone estradiol.

== Incidents ==
The history of chlordecone incidents is reviewed in Who's Poisoning America?: Corporate Polluters and Their Victims in the Chemical Age (1982).

=== James River estuary ===
In July 1975, Virginia Governor Mills Godwin Jr. shut down the James River to fishing for 100 miles, from Richmond to the Chesapeake Bay. This ban remained in effect for 13 years, until efforts to clean up the river began to show results.

Due to the pollution risks, many fishermen, marinas, seafood businesses, and restaurants, along with their employees along the river suffered economic losses. In 1981, a large group of these entities sued Allied Chemical in federal district court (Eastern District of Virginia), claiming special economic damages from Allied's negligent damage to the fish and wildlife. In a case that sometimes appears in law school courses on Remedies, the court rejected the traditional "economic-loss rule", which requires physical impact causing personal injury or property damage to receive economic damages, and instead allowed a limited group of the plaintiffs—the fishing boat owners, the marinas, and the bait and tackle shops—to recover economic damages from Allied Chemical.

=== French Antilles ===
The French islands of Martinique and Guadeloupe are heavily contaminated with chlordecone, following years of its massive and unrestricted use on banana plantations: primarily against the insect pest Cosmopolites sordidus. Despite a 1990 ban on the substance in mainland France, the economically powerful banana planters lobbied intensively to obtain a waiver to keep using Kepone until 1993. They argued that no alternative pesticide was available, which has since been disputed. After the 1993 ban, the banana planters were discreetly granted derogations to use their remaining stocks, and a 2005 report prepared by the French National Assembly states that after the 1993 ban was imposed, the chemical was illegally imported to the islands under the name Curlone, and continued to be used for many years. Since 2003, local authorities in the two islands have restricted the cultivation of various food crops because the soil is badly contaminated by chlordecone. A 2018 large-scale study by the French public health agency, Santé publique France, shows that 95% of the inhabitants of Guadeloupe and 92% of those of Martinique are contaminated by the chemical. Guadeloupe has one of the highest prostate cancer diagnosis rates in the world.
