= Mirex =

- Mirex

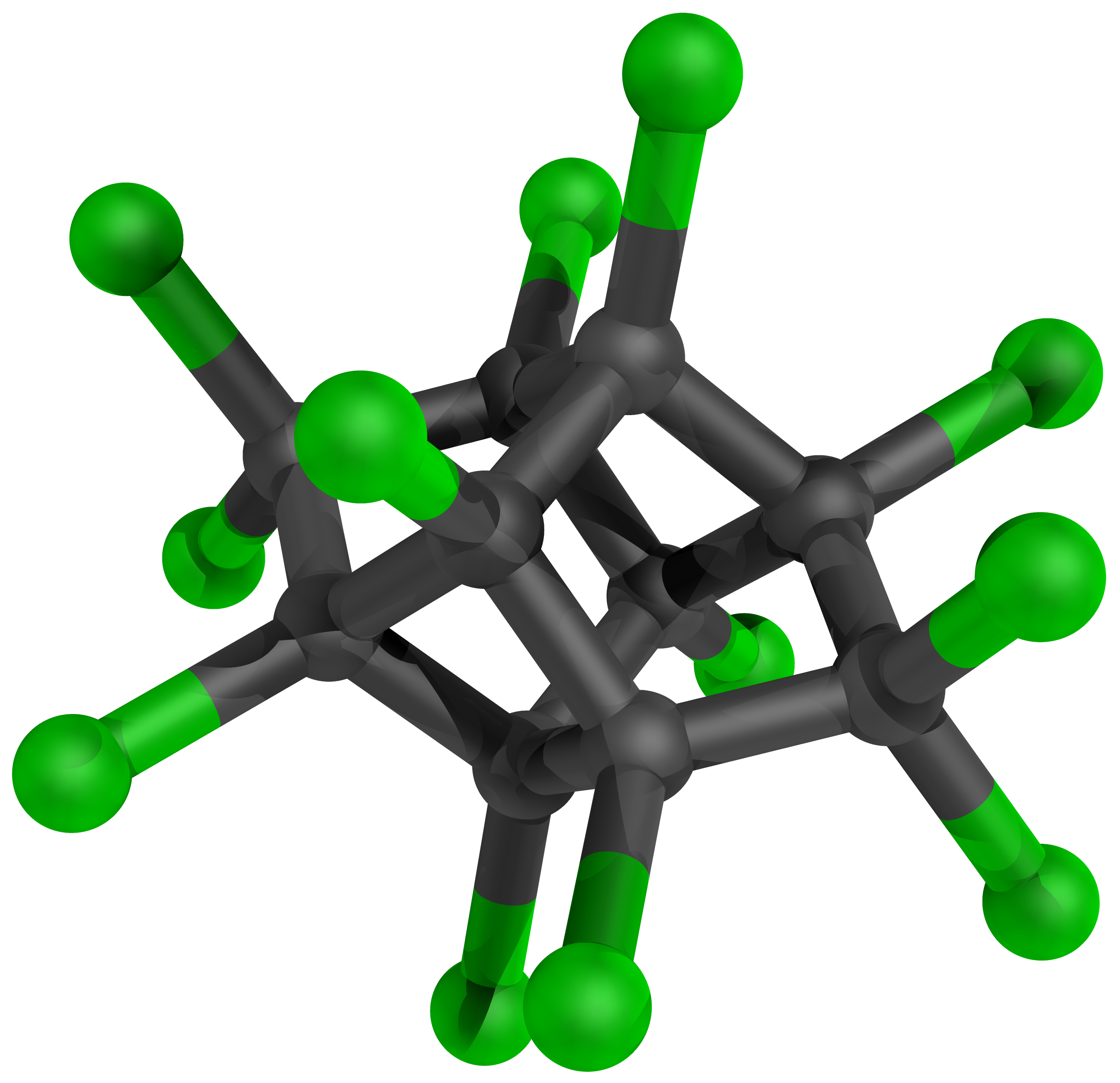
- Ball-and-stick model

Names
- Preferred IUPAC name Dodecachlorooctahydro-1H-1,3,4-(epimethanetriyl)cyclobuta[cd]pentalene
- Other names Perchlorodihomocubane

Identifiers
CAS Number	2385-85-5
3D model (JSmol)	Interactive image
ChEBI	CHEBI:34852
ChemSpider	16054
ECHA InfoCard	100.017.452
EC Number	219-196-6
KEGG	C14184
MeSH	D008917
PubChem CID	16945
UNII	Z917AN264P
CompTox Dashboard (EPA)	DTXSID7020895
- InChI: InChI=1S/C10Cl12/c11-1-2(12)7(17)4(14)3(13,5(1,15)9(7,19)20)6(1,16)10(21,22)8(2,4)18 Key: GVYLCNUFSHDAAW-UHFFFAOYSA-N; InChI=1/C10Cl12/c11-1-2(12)7(17)4(14)3(13,5(1,15)9(7,19)20)6(1,16)10(21,22)8(2,4)18 Key: GVYLCNUFSHDAAW-UHFFFAOYAV
- SMILES: ClC12C(C3(Cl)Cl)(Cl)C4(Cl)C1(Cl)C(Cl)(Cl)C5(Cl)C4(Cl)C3(Cl)C52Cl

Properties
Chemical formula	C_{10}Cl_{12}
Molar mass	545.55 g/mol
Melting point	485 °C (905 °F; 758 K)
- Except where otherwise noted, data are given for materials in their standard state (at 25 °C [77 °F], 100 kPa). verify (what is ?) Infobox references

Mirex is an organochloride that was commercialized as an insecticide and later banned because of its impact on the environment. This white crystalline odorless solid is a derivative of both cyclopentadiene and cubane. It was popularized to control fire ants but by virtue of chemical robustness and lipophilicity it was recognized as a bioaccumulative pollutant. The spread of the red imported fire ant was encouraged by the use of mirex, which also kills native ants that are highly competitive with the fire ants. The United States Environmental Protection Agency prohibited its use in 1976. It is prohibited by the Stockholm Convention on Persistent Organic Pollutants.

== Production and applications ==
Mirex was first synthesized in 1946, but was not used in pesticide formulations until 1955. Mirex was produced by the dimerization of hexachlorocyclopentadiene in the presence of aluminium chloride.

Mirex is a stomach insecticide, meaning that it must be ingested by the organism in order to poison it. The insecticidal use was focused on Southeastern United States to control fire ants. Approximately 250,000 kg of mirex were applied to fields between 1962 and 1975 (US NRC, 1978). Most of the mirex was in the form of "4X mirex bait", which consists of 0.3% mirex in 14.7% soybean oil mixed with 85% corncob grits. Application of the 4X bait was designed to give a coverage of 4.2 g mirex/ha and was delivered by aircraft, helicopter or tractor. 1x and 2x bait were also used. Use of mirex as a pesticide was banned in 1978. The Stockholm Convention banned production and use of several persistent organic pollutants, and mirex is one of the "dirty dozen".

== Degradation ==
Much like other perchlorocarbons such as carbon tetrachloride, mirex does not burn easily; pyrolysis products are expected to include carbon dioxide, carbon monoxide, hydrogen chloride, chlorine, phosgene, and possibly other organochlorine species. Slow oxidation of mirex can be used to produce chlordecone ("Kepone"), a related insecticide that is also banned in most of the western world, but is more readily biodegraded. Sunlight degrades mirex to photomirex (8-monohydromirex) and 2,8-dihydromirex.

Photomirex

2,8-dihydromirex

Mirex is highly resistant to microbiological degradation. It only slowly dechlorinates to a monohydro derivative by anaerobic microbial action in sewage sludge and by enteric bacteria. Degradation by soil microorganisms has not been described.

== Bioaccumulation and biomagnification ==
Mirex is highly cumulative and amount depends upon the concentration and duration of exposure. There is evidence of accumulation of mirex in aquatic and terrestrial food chains to harmful levels. After 6 applications of mirex bait at 1.4 kg/ha, high mirex levels were found in some species; turtle fat contained 24.8 mg mirex/kg, kingfishers, 1.9 mg/kg, coyote fat, 6 mg/kg, opossum fat, 9.5 mg/kg, and racoon fat, 73.9 mg/kg. In a model ecosystem with a terrestrial-aquatic interface, sorghum seedlings were treated with mirex at 1.1 kg/ha. Caterpillars fed on these seedlings and their faeces contaminated the water which contained algae, snails, Daphnia, mosquito larvae, and fish. After 33 days, the ecological magnification value was 219 for fish and 1165 for snails.

Although general environmental levels are low, it is widespread in the biotic and abiotic environment. Being lipophilic, mirex is strongly adsorbed on sediments.

== Safety ==
Mirex is only moderately toxic in single-dose animal studies (oral LD_{50} values range from 365–3000 mg/kg body weight). It can enter the body via inhalation, ingestion, and via the skin. The most sensitive effects of repeated exposure in animals are principally associated with the liver, and these effects have been observed with doses as low as 1.0 mg/kg diet (0.05 mg/kg body weight per day), the lowest dose tested. At higher dose levels, it is fetotoxic (25 mg/kg in diet) and teratogenic (6.0 mg/kg per day). Mirex was not generally active in short-term tests for genetic activity. There is sufficient evidence of its carcinogenicity in mice and rats. Delayed onset of toxic effects and mortality is typical of mirex poisoning. Mirex is toxic for a range of aquatic organisms, with crustacea being particularly sensitive.

Mirex induces pervasive chronic physiological and biochemical disorders in various vertebrates. No acceptable daily intake (ADI) for mirex has been advised by FAO/WHO. IARC (1979) evaluated mirex's carcinogenic hazard and concluded that "there is sufficient evidence for its carcinogenicity to mice and rats. In the absence of adequate data in humans, based on above result it can be said, that it has carcinogenic risk to humans". Data on human health effects do not exist.

== Health effects ==
Per a 1995 ATSDR report mirex caused fatty changes in the livers, hyperexcitability and convulsion, and inhibition of reproduction in animals. It is a potent endocrine disruptor, interfering with estrogen-mediated functions such as ovulation, pregnancy, and endometrial growth. It also induced liver cancer by interaction with estrogen in female rodents.
