= Drin =

Drin may refer to:

- Drin (river), a river in Albania, Kosovo and North Macedonia
- Drin Valley, the valley in northern and eastern Albania, North Macedonia, and Kosovo along the Drin river
- Drin, a townland in County Down, Northern Ireland
- Drins, a group of chlorinated insecticides whose names end in "-drin":
  - Aldrin
  - Dieldrin
  - Endrin
