= C4H6O =

The molecular formula C_{4}H_{6}O may refer to:

- Crotonaldehyde
- Cyclobutanone
- Dihydrofurans
  - 2,3-Dihydrofuran
  - 2,5-Dihydrofuran
- Divinyl ether
- Methacrolein
- Methyl vinyl ketone
