= Hexachlorocyclopentadiene =

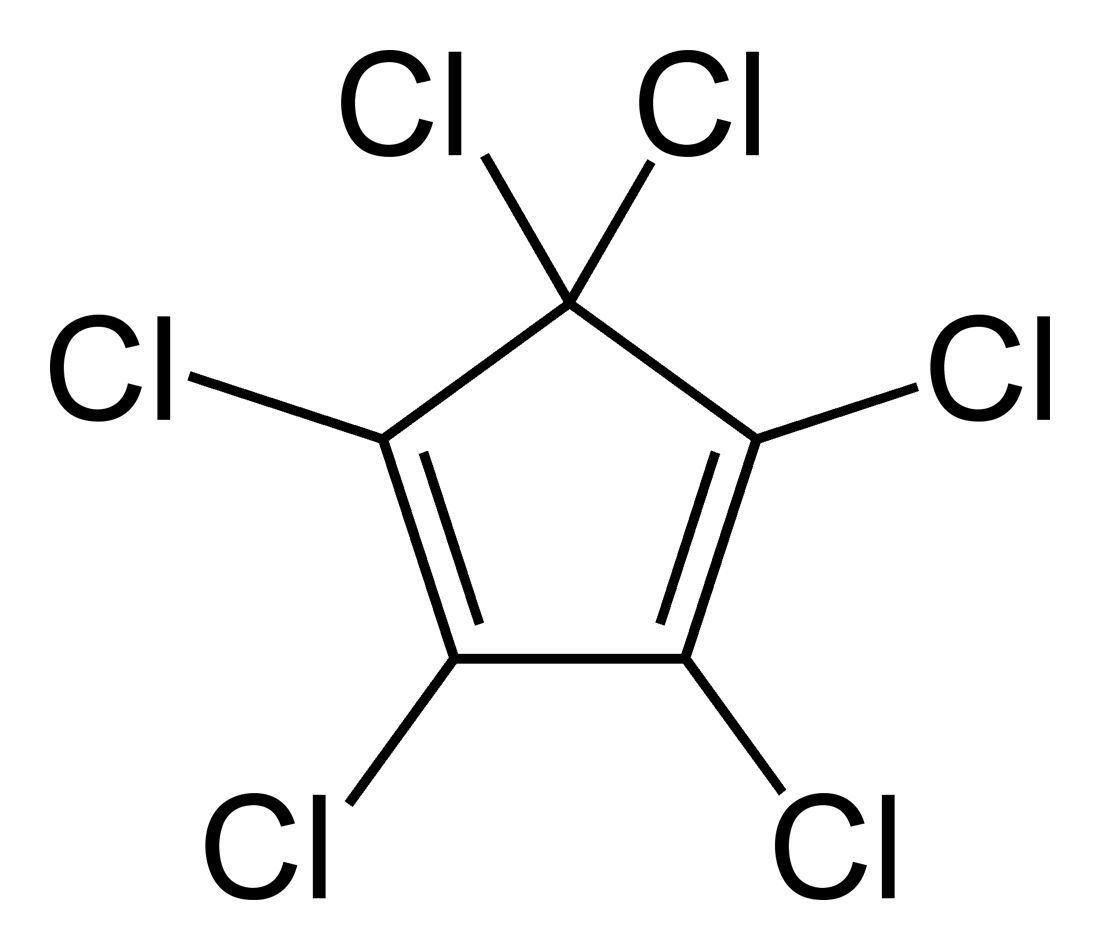

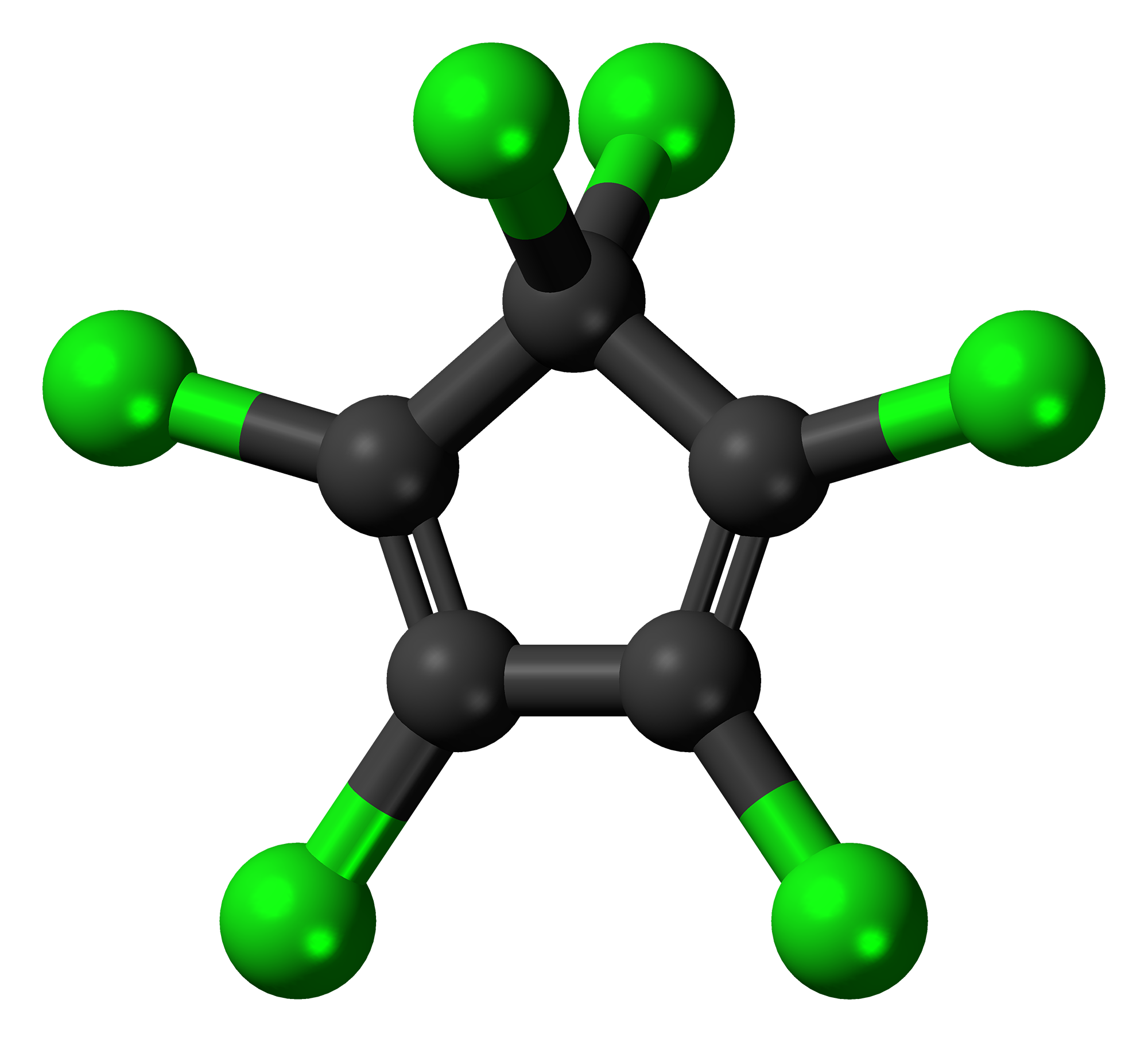

Names
- IUPAC name 1,2,3,4,5,5-hexachlorocyclopenta-1,3-diene
- Other names graphlox, perchlorocyclopentadiene

Identifiers
CAS Number	77-47-4
3D model (JSmol)	Interactive image
ChemSpider	6233
ECHA InfoCard	100.000.937
PubChem CID	6478
UNII	IP6ATU242I
CompTox Dashboard (EPA)	DTXSID2020688
- InChI: InChI=1S/C5Cl6/c6-1-2(7)4(9)5(10,11)3(1)8 Key: VUNCWTMEJYMOOR-UHFFFAOYSA-N; InChI=1/C5Cl6/c6-1-2(7)4(9)5(10,11)3(1)8 Key: VUNCWTMEJYMOOR-UHFFFAOYAM
- SMILES: ClC1(Cl)C(/Cl)=C(/Cl)\C(\Cl)=C1\Cl

Properties
Chemical formula	C_{5}Cl_{6}
Molar mass	272.76 g·mol^{−1}
Appearance	Pale-yellow to amber-colored liquid
Odor	Pungent, unpleasant
Density	1.702 g/cm3
Melting point	−10 °C (14 °F; 263 K)
Boiling point	239 °C (462 °F; 512 K)
Solubility in water	0.0002% (Reacts, 25°C)
Vapor pressure	0.08 mmHg

Hazards
- Occupational safety and health (OHS/OSH)
Main hazards	Teratogen
Flash point	100 °C (212 °F; 373 K)
- NIOSH (US health exposure limits)
PEL (Permissible)	none
REL (Recommended)	TWA 0.01 ppm (0.1 mg/m^{3})
IDLH (Immediate danger)	N.D.
- Except where otherwise noted, data are given for materials in their standard state (at 25 °C [77 °F], 100 kPa). verify (what is ?) Infobox references

Hexachlorocyclopentadiene (HCCPD), also known as C-56, Graphlox, and HRS 1655, is an organochlorine compound with the formula C_{5}Cl_{6}. It is a precursor to pesticides, flame retardants, and dyes. It is a colourless liquid, although commercial samples appear lemon-yellow liquid sometimes with a bluish vapour. Many of its derivatives proved to be highly controversial, as studies showed them to be persistent organic pollutants. An estimated 270,000 tons were produced until 1976, and smaller amounts continue to be produced today.

== Synthesis and production ==
Hexachlorocyclopentadiene is prepared by chlorination of cyclopentadiene to give 1,1,2,3,4,5-octachlorocyclopentane, which in a second step undergoes dehydrochlorination: The first procedure uses alkaline hypochlorite and after fractional distillation has a yield of about 75%, the other 25% consists of lower chlorinated cyclopentadienes. The second process uses thermal dechlorination, which occurs at 470-480 °C and gives a yield higher than 90%. Therefore, the first process is easier to perform, but the second gives a more pure product.

C_{5}H_{6} + 6 Cl_{2} → C_{5}H_{2}Cl_{8} + 4 HCl
C_{5}H_{2}Cl_{8} → C_{5}Cl_{6} + 2 HCl

Besides manufacturers that produce the chemical for scientific synthesis and reference, two companies produce HCCPD on a large scale for industrial use: Velsicol Chemical LLC in the United States and Jiangsu Anpon Electrochemicals Co. in China. Velsicol produces the chemical for rubber adherents, flame retardants and pesticides. Jiangsu Anpon's customers are more enigmatic. The company itself is a subsidiary of China National Agrochemical Corporation, specializing in chloro-alkali and agrochemicals.

Because hexachlorocyclopentadiene is so easily made into persistent pollutants, Velsicol requires buyers to undergo a strict review and educational program on the storage, use and disposal of the chemical before transaction.

== Reactions ==
HCCP is an electrophilic building block. It degrades in base. Alcoholysis affords ketals of the formula C_{5}Cl_{4}(OR)_{2}.

HCCP readily undergoes Diels-Alder reactions with alkenes to give a variety of adducts that were commercialized as pesticides. The main derivatives are:

- aldrin from norbornadiene, named after the Diels-Alder reaction (the related dieldrin is a metabolite of aldrin)
- isodrin
- chlordane from cyclopentadiene, followed by chlorination
- endrin from acetylene, followed by cyclopentadiene, followed by epoxidation
- heptachlor from cyclopentadiene, followed by monochlorination
- isobenzan from dihydrofuran followed by chlorination
- endosulfan from cis-butene-1,4-diol, followed by esterification with SOCl_{2}
- dienochlor.

Most of these pesticides are no longer commercially available and banned by the Stockholm Convention on Persistent Organic Pollutants due to their toxicity to humans and animals.

=== Degradation in the environment ===
In surface water, photolysis is the most common reaction route, with a degradation half-life of 2 to 4 minutes. Deeper under water where less light penetrates, hydrolysis and biodegradation are prominent pathways. Light, water and oxygen can cause a double bond to oxidize to give pentachlorocyclopentenones. These may undergo ring-opening hydrolysis to form pentachloro-cis-2,4-pentadienoic acid, which decarboxylates to cis- and trans- pentachlorobutadiene, though this is only a minor pathway.

== Toxicokinetics ==
HCCPD absorption in the body occurs mostly through the lungs, gastrointestinal tract and skin. Overall the levels of HCCPD in blood were lower when administered through food compared to when inhalation was used. This may indicate a poor absorption in the gastrointestinal tract due to binding to the gastrointestinal contents. When HCCPD is absorbed, it is distributed to the liver, kidney and lungs. The organ with the highest concentration differs when comparing rats and mice. The highest concentration in rats is found in the kidney versus in the liver of mice.

=== Absorption ===
The relevant absorption studies are done using radiolabeled HCCPD. In rats, the route of absorption appeared to have a significant effect on the degree of absorption. The low levels in blood might indicate poor gastrointestinal absorption. Generally, the site of uptake shows the highest concentration in animals. In inhalation studies, the lungs showed the highest concentration of HCCPD. The concentration at that time found in kidneys was 8 times higher compared to the liver. When given oral doses, the concentration in blood peaked at 4 hours after ingestion. The general distribution pattern stayed the same as the concentration found in the liver was 30–40% of what was found in the liver. Opposite results are found for mice. In mice the concentration in the liver is found to be higher than in the kidney after oral ingestion. The amount of HCCPD in the kidneys was between 33–50% of that in the liver.

For multiple oral exposures in rats, steady state concentrations ranged were achieved in 10 to 30 days. The liver reached the steady state concentration in 30 days. At this time the concentration of HCCPD was roughly half of what was found in the kidneys. In mice, steady state in reproductive and fat tissue was reached in 20 days. At this time, the amount of HCCPD in the kidney was approximately half of the concentration found in the liver. In an intravenous study in rats, the approximate distribution of HCCPD in the tissues remained the same.

=== Toxicodynamics ===
Complete oxidation of the compound to carbon dioxide is limited as apparently less than 1% of the radiolabel is found in carbon dioxide.

The exact pathway for the complete metabolism of HCCPD is not known. There are contradicting results from different studies regarding the composition of excreted material. The metabolites were found to be polar in one study and nonpolar in the other. In addition, some of the potential metabolites such as hexachloro-2-cyclopentanone, hexachloro-3-cyclopentanone, hexachloroindone, or octachloro-3a,4,7,7a-tetrahydro-4,7-methanoindene-1,8-dione were not yet identified by extraction of excreted material.

As the compound readily undergoes Diels–Alder reactions synthetically, it is possible that the HCCPD could react directly with cellular alkenes in a cycloaddition reaction. This might then explain why HCCPD causes effects at the point of contact for all the possible routes of exposure, in addition to the tissue-binding properties.

=== Excretion ===
There is a slight difference in ratios of the amount excreted in urine and the amount excreted in feces between rats and mice. Though generally, the highest portion of radiolabeled metabolites is recovered in urine if HCCPD is inhaled. Furthermore, the highest portion of radiolabeled molecules is recovered in feces if HCCPD is orally ingested.

== Indications (biomarkers) ==
=== Effects ===
Humans exposed to HCCPD do not show adverse health effects exclusive to that chemical. A small percentage of wastewater treatment workers who were exposed to water containing HCCPD in 1977 reported irritation of skin and eyes, chest discomfort, headaches, nausea and fatigue. In the long term, they showed irregularities in their liver function using tests that monitor enzyme levels. However, these irregularities could be due to many other compounds and variations in health. Other proposed parameters for characterizing effects in humans, like urinary porphyrin excretion, were also tested for their potential use as a biomarker, but none were deemed significant enough. Experiments performed on laboratory animals like rats and mice show that a yellow-brown pigment forms in the epithelium of the nose after long-term inhalation exposure, even at low doses, which is considered a useful biomarker for long-term exposure.

=== Unusual susceptibility ===
When there is pre-existing damage to organs involved in uptake or metabolism such as lungs and the liver, people can be more susceptible to HCCPD exposure because of their already compromised organ function. Because respiratory exposure seems to be the most prevalent route of exposure, people suffering from asthma are probably more susceptible to adverse effects than the general population. Another group that is particularly vulnerable to hazardous chemicals is children. In their development there are critical periods where distinct structures and functions can be more susceptible towards disruption, and the damage done might only become apparent in a later stage of life. Absorption may differ for children because of their incompletely developed organs and larger surface to body weight ratio. Fortunately, it is very unlikely that small children are immediately exposed to HCCPD because it is only found as an impurity in pesticides and is not used in homes.

== Effects on animals ==
No studies were done on the lethality of humans in relation to HCCPD. It was however tested on animals and is postulated to have effects on brain and adrenal glands. In the brain, HCCPD or a metabolite thereof can react with lipids. In order to see degenerative brain effects in for example rats, the animals are exposed to a high dose of HCCPD concentration by inhalation. When dealing with low exposure levels, HCCPD reactivity makes the chance of reactive species in the blood at high concentrations very low. However, at higher doses the probability of transporting reactive material across the blood-brain barrier is higher.

Short-term inhalation of HCCPD is lethal to mice, rats, rabbits and guinea pigs. The lethality of the animals can be affected by the concentration and duration of HCCPD exposure. From all the animals tested, guinea pigs showed to be the most resistant to the compound toxicity. Almost all biological systems are shown to be vulnerable to the toxicity of HCCPD, except the hematological and musculoskeletal systems.

=== Oral effects ===
Single doses of HCCPD were found to be moderately toxic to animals if ingested orally. However, as the compound was not entirely pure (93.3%) while performing studies, some of the toxic effects could be attributed to the impurities, especially at high doses.

Data of oral effects on other species that mice and rats are limited. Single high doses of HCCPD resulted in increased effort to breathe in rats and rabbits alike. The lung tissues of these animals were hyperemic and edematous after a given dose. Extensive lung hemorrhage appeared after a single non lethal dose after 21 days. Lower doses in rats caused no observable tissue changes in the lungs. High doses created degenerative changes to the heart as well. Again, low doses resulted in no observable change in heart tissue. Also, these rats and rabbits experienced diarrhea after single oral dosages of HCCPD, and showed acute necrotic lesions in the forestomach. In repeated exposure experiments on rats and mice inflammation and epithelial hyperplasia of the forestomach were observed. The dose had a direct relationship to the severity of these effects. This and the location suggests that these effects result from direct contact of the tissue with HCCPD. Body weight was heavily affected after oral ingestion of HCCPD by rats, more severely for males than females.

=== Dermal effects ===
Increasing dermal doses showed a shorter survival time for the animals. Lung effects of rabbits were examined in dermal animal studies, showing congested blood and fluid by exposure of HCCPD (93,3% pure, so again a possibility of contaminant interference). Other effects regarding organs with dermal dose were degenerative changes in the heart, necrosis of the liver and kidney tubules and degenerative changes of the adrenal glands.

The form in which HCCPD appears in the environment, so in its pure form or in solution, showed a striking effect on the epidermis of rabbits, guinea pigs and monkeys. Damage to the skin could be seen, namely discolored and inflamed skin. When the animals did not die by these lesions, they healed over time by itself.

=== Inhalation effects ===
HCCPD is highly toxic to animals when inhaling its vapours. No human studies regarding lethality were done, but there has been an incident involving a waste water treatment centre where humans were exposed, from which most relevant human information is taken.

==== Human inhalation effects ====
There is data for human exposure to HCCPD for numerous organ systems. Waste water treatment plant and water cleanup crew workers were exposed after industrial release of the compound into the environment. The initial concentration of the compound in air was unknown but was later determined to be ranging between 0.27 and 0.97 ppm. Workers noticed a strange odor on the plant and even a blue haze after a heavy rain. When some of them sought medical attention, it was determined the plant was contaminated with HCCPD, and numerous tests were performed to document these circumstances. Approximately one fifth of waste water treatment workers reported having nausea and abdominal cramps after exposure for a period between 3 and 15 days. They also reported respiratory complaints like sore throats, coughing and breathing difficulty. However, tests on lung function and chest X-rays did not show any abnormalities. Workers exposed to HCCPD for a longer time reported respiratory irritation, nasal irritation and sinus congestion, most likely because of direct contact of these tissues with HCCPD from the air, and not as a systemic effect through the lungs.

In addition, elevated levels of lactic dehydrogenase was found in 11 out of 41 workers from the wastewater treatment. These levels was not nearly as high for workers from the water cleanup crew, but the aspartate aminotransferase levels were elevated for 12 out of 97 of these workers. These enzymes might indicate damage to heart, as well as to the liver. No evidence of heart function impairment was found in both worker groups though. The elevated levels in patients diminished after a period of 3 weeks.

==== Animal inhalation effects ====
For prolonged exposure, significant differences occur between lab animal species. Where all mice died in the first week in a 13-week study, being exposed to 2 ppm HCCPD for 5 days a week, 6 hours a day, rats however survived until the third week. For a very low exposure of 0.04 ppm, 3 out of 20 mice died and none of the rats died. Chronic exposure of HCCPD at very low concentrations produced a yellow-brown pigment in the lung, tracheal and nasal epithelium in rats and mice. The pigmentation did not disappear after the exposure stopped.

For acute high exposures (1 hour, 42 ppm) all animals died, after showing difficulty breathing and gasping for air. Their lung tissues showed hemorrhagic lesions, inflammation, edema and necrosis in the bronchi. However recovery of the animals that survived was apparent 2 weeks after the treatment.

Cardiac and gastrointestinal function seemed not be impaired after exposure of HCCPD in rats, mice and monkeys. Moderate hepatic tissue degeneration was observed for acute inhalation. The same tissue degeneration was observed for longer experiments with lower concentrations.

== History ==
HCCPD is a highly toxic organochlorine compound that was first mentioned as a diene in certain Diels-Alder reactions in 1930. The HCCPD chemical family quickly attracted increased attention with the discovery of its insecticidal properties in 1955 and extensive commercialization. However, due to extensive use, the HCCPD family of insecticides (chlordane, aldrin, dieldrin, endrin, heptachlor) became less effective as a result of genetic mutations of the targeted insects. The number of insects resistant to cyclodienes and lindane approached 300 by 1989.

Later, in 1957, another use of the compound was found, namely as a flame retardant for polyesters. In addition, HCCPD was used to make a dimer. This dimer was also known as “Mirex” or “Box dimer” and was offered commercially as a flame retardant to be used in polymers such as polypropylene. In the 1970s, it was shown that the Mirex dimer degrades in the environment into kepone, a well established carcinogen. This development raised concern and the use of Mirex was completely discontinued. Before this, Diels-Alder adducts of HCCPD were developed with a number of cyclic dienes. Some of these compounds gained commercial attention such as the adduct of HCCPD with 1,5-cyclooctadiene, which was sold under the name Dechlorane plus. This flame retardant was used in polyolefins and Nylon and also in wires and cables, due to its good moisture resistance. In the meantime, scientific research has also demonstrated its impact on the environment

Today, almost all HCCPD derivatives have been banned or are under consideration for banning, according to the deliberations of the Stockholm Convention on Persistent Organic Pollutants. However, given that HCCPD is a versatile raw material for the synthesis of a wide range of end products, as of October 2021 it is still available commercially.
