= Isobenzan =

Names
- IUPAC name 1,3,4,5,6,7,8,8-Octachloro-1,3,3a,4,7,7a-hexahydro-4,7-methanoisobenzofuran
- Other names Telodrin; 1,3,4,5,6,7,8,8-Octachloro-4,7-methylene-3a,4,7,7a-tetrahydro-isobenzofuran

Identifiers
| CAS Number | 297-78-9 |
| 3D model (JSmol) | Interactive image |
| ChEBI | CHEBI:82099 |
| ChemSpider | 8914 |
| ECHA InfoCard | 100.005.497 |
| EC Number | 206-045-4 |
| KEGG | C18960 |
| PubChem CID | 9271 |
| RTECS number | PC1225000 |
| UNII | 8IAN133486 |
| UN number | 2761 |
| CompTox Dashboard (EPA) | DTXSID3021306 |
- InChI: InChI=1S/C9H4Cl8O/c10-3-4(11)8(15)2-1(5(12)18-6(2)13)7(3,14)9(8,16)17/h1-2,5-6H Key: LRWHHSXTGZSMSN-UHFFFAOYSA-N
- SMILES: ClC1C2C3(Cl)C(Cl)=C(Cl)C(C3(Cl)Cl)(Cl)C2C(Cl)O1

Properties
| Chemical formula | C_{9}H_{4}Cl_{8}O |
| Molar mass | 411.73 g·mol^{−1} |
| Appearance | Whitish to light brown crystalline powder |
| Density | 1.87 g/cm^{3} |
| Melting point | 121.3 °C (250.3 °F; 394.4 K) |
| Solubility in water | Practically insoluble |

Hazards
- GHS labelling
| Pictograms | (GHS06: Toxic) (GHS08: Health hazard) (GHS09: Environmental hazard) |
| Signal word | Danger |
| Hazard statements | H300, H310, H320, H361, H370, H372, H410 |
| Precautionary statements | P201, P202, P260, P262, P264, P270, P273, P280, P281, P301+P310, P302+P350, P305+P351+P338, P307+P311, P308+P313, P310, P314, P321, P322, P330, P337+P313, P361, P363, P391, P405, P501 |
| NFPA 704 (fire diamond) | 4 0 0 |
| Flash point | Non-flammable |
- Except where otherwise noted, data are given for materials in their standard state (at 25 °C [77 °F], 100 kPa). verify (what is ?) Infobox references

Isobenzan (telodrin) is a highly toxic organochloride insecticide. It was produced only in the period from 1958 to 1965 and its use has been since discontinued. It is a persistent organic pollutant that can remain in soil for 2 to 7 years, and the biological half-life of isobenzan in human blood is estimated to be about 2.8 years.

It is classified as an extremely hazardous substance in the United States as defined in Section 302 of the U.S. Emergency Planning and Community Right-to-Know Act (42 U.S.C. 11002), and is subject to strict reporting requirements by facilities which produce, store, or use it in significant quantities.

== Production ==
The precursor 4,5,6,7,10,10-hexachloro-4,7-endomethylene-4,7,8,9-tetrahydrophthalane can be obtained in two synthetic routes. In a synthesis method report published in 1954, 1,4,5,6,7,7-hexachloro-2,3-bishydroxymethylbicyclo[2,2,1]hept-5-ene is obtained, which is then dehydrated to the precursor. In 1961, a direct preparation of the precursor via a Diels-Alder reaction with hexachlorocyclopentadiene and 2,5-Dihydrofuran was found. The target compound is then synthesized by photochlorination of the precursor.
