= Dechlorane =

Dechlorane may refer to:

- Mirex, an obsolete insecticide, sometime sold under the name dechlorane
- Dechlorane plus, an organochlorine flame retardant
