= Dienochlor =

Names
- IUPAC name 1,2,3,4,5-Pentachloro-5-(1,2,3,4,5-pentachlorocyclopenta-2,4-dien-1-yl)cyclopenta-1,3-diene
- Other names Decachlor, perchlorbis(cyclopenta-2,4-dien-1-yl), pentac

Identifiers
CAS Number	2227-17-0
3D model (JSmol)	Interactive image
ChemSpider	15823
ECHA InfoCard	100.017.058
PubChem CID	16686
UNII	243Z2SVZ40
CompTox Dashboard (EPA)	DTXSID9032371
- InChI: InChI=1S/C10Cl10/c11-1-2(12)6(16)9(19,5(1)15)10(20)7(17)3(13)4(14)8(10)18 Key: LWLJUMBEZJHXHV-UHFFFAOYSA-N
- SMILES: ClC1=C(Cl)C(Cl)(C2(Cl)C(Cl)=C(Cl)C(Cl)=C2Cl)C(Cl)=C1Cl

Properties
Chemical formula	C_{10}Cl_{10}
Molar mass	474.61 g·mol^{−1}
Appearance	Yellow crystalline solid
Density	1.923 g/cm^{3}
Melting point	122–123 °C (252–253 °F; 395–396 K)
Boiling point	250 °C (482 °F; 523 K)
Solubility in water	Practically insoluble in water

Hazards
- GHS labelling
Pictograms	(GHS07: Exclamation mark) (GHS09: Environmental hazard)
Signal word	Warning
Hazard statements	H302, H319, H400
Precautionary statements	P264, P270, P273, P280, P301+P312, P305+P351+P338, P313, P330, P337, P391, P501
Flash point	187.8 °C (370.0 °F; 460.9 K)
- Except where otherwise noted, data are given for materials in their standard state (at 25 °C [77 °F], 100 kPa). Infobox references

Dienochlor is an organochlorine compound included in the group of cyclic chlorinated hydrocarbons. Its chemical formula is C_{10}Cl_{10}. Dienochlor is mostly used as a pesticide and ovicide.

== Synthesis ==
Dienochlor can be obtained by catalytic reduction of hexachlorocyclopentadiene (e.g. with copper or hydrogen).

Dienochlor synthesis

== Properties ==
Dienochlor is a combustible yellow solid which is practically insoluble in water. It decomposes when heated above 250 °C. It decomposes rapidly under the influence of sunlight.

== Applications ==
Dienochlor is used as an acaricide under the trade name Pentac for combating mites (Tetranychus, Polyphagotarsonemus latus) on roses, chrysanthemums, and other ornamental plants.

== Regulations ==
Dienochlor was approved for use in the Western Germany between 1971 and 1990. In the European Union, no plant protection products containing dienochlor are authorized.
