= Dechlorane plus =

Polychlorinated flame retardant

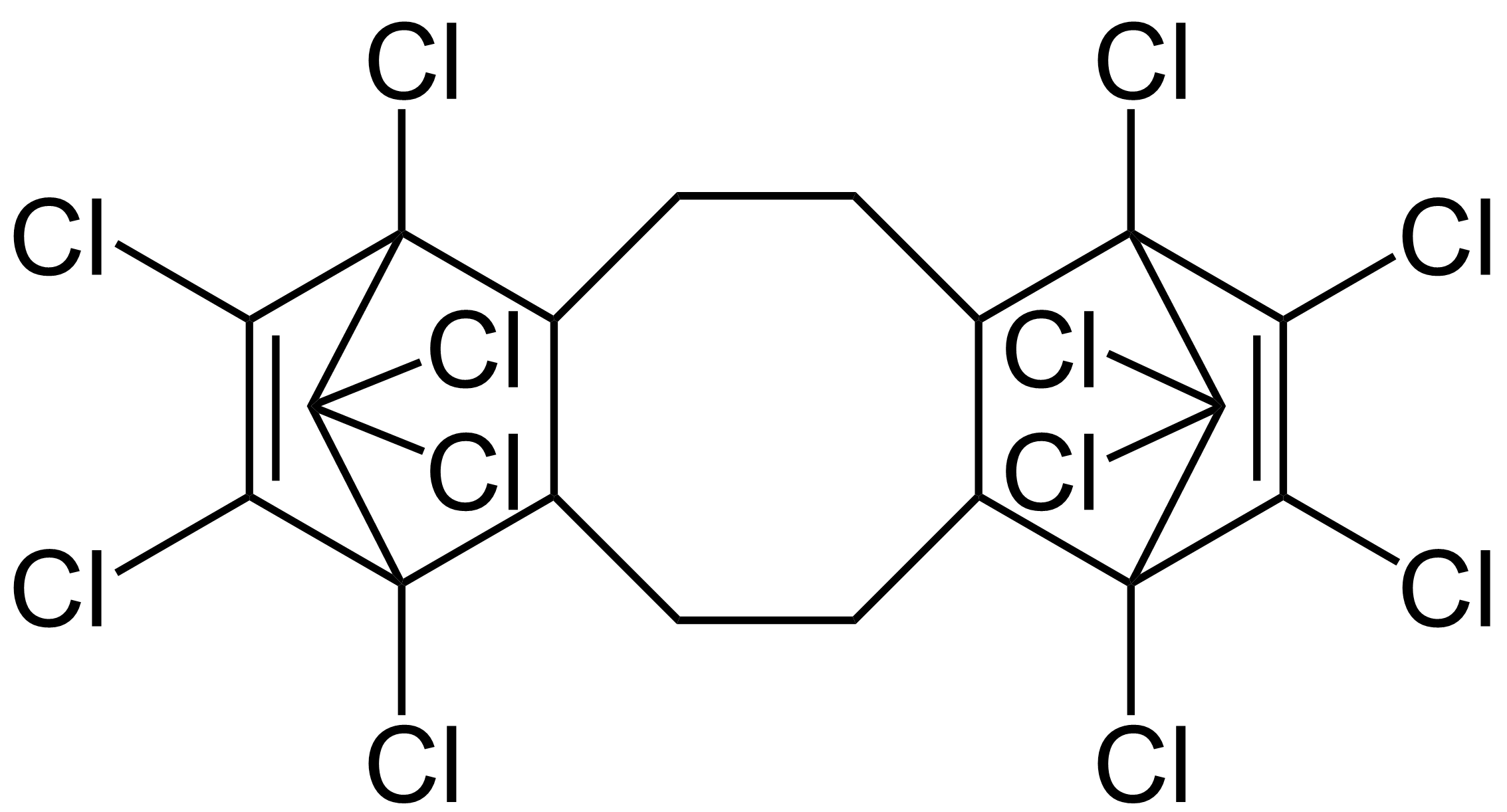

Names
- IUPAC name 1,2,3,4,7,8,9,10,13,13,14,14-dodecachloro-1,4,4a,5,6,6a,7,10,10a,11,12,12a-dodecahydro-1,4,7,10-dimethanodibenzo[a,e]cyclooctene
- Other names Dechloran A

Identifiers
CAS Number	13560-89-9
3D model (JSmol)	Interactive image
ChemSpider	24323
ECHA InfoCard	100.033.575
EC Number	236-948-9
PubChem CID	26111
UNII	193G0ER097
CompTox Dashboard (EPA)	DTXSID7027750
- InChI: InChI=1/C18H12Cl12/c19-9-10(20)15(25)7-3-4-8-6(2-1-5(7)13(9,23)17(15,27)28)14(24)11(21)12(22)16(8,26)18(14,29)30/h5-8H,1-4H2 Key: UGQQAJOWXNCOPY-UHFFFAOYAP
- SMILES: Cl\C2=C(/Cl)C3(Cl)C1CCC4C(CCC1C2(Cl)C3(Cl)Cl)C5(Cl)C(\Cl)=C(\Cl)C4(Cl)C5(Cl)Cl

Properties
Chemical formula	C_{18}H_{12}Cl_{12}
Molar mass	653.72 g/mol
Appearance	white, crystalline solid
Density	1.8 g/cm^{3}
Melting point	350 °C (662 °F; 623 K) (decomposes)
Solubility in water	0.044–249 μg/L
- Except where otherwise noted, data are given for materials in their standard state (at 25 °C [77 °F], 100 kPa). Infobox references

Dechlorane plus (abbrev. DDC-CO) is a polychlorinated flame retardant produced by Oxychem.

Its log P is 11.27±0.94.

It is produced by the Diels-Alder reaction of two equivalents of hexachlorocyclopentadiene with one equivalent of cyclooctadiene. The syn and anti isomer are formed in the approximate ratio of 1:3.

syn isomer

anti isomer

== Environmental concerns ==
Dechlorane plus was first found in the environment in 2006 in air around the Great Lakes. Since then, its environmental occurrence has been further documented in several studies including sediments of the Great Lakes; zooplankton, fish, and mussels in Lake Winnipeg and Lake Ontario; air and seawater from the Arctic to Antarctica; and Chinese air. In 2011, modeling data indicated that Dechlorane Plus may be persistent, bioaccumulative, and subject to long-range transport. The 2023 Conference of the Parties of the United Nations Stockholm Convention on Persistent Organic Pollutants took the decision to eliminate the use of Dechlorane Plus, by listing this chemical in Annex A to the Convention.

Dechlorane plus was added to the list of REACH Substances of Very High Concern on January 15, 2018.

== Literature ==
- ENVIRON Health Sciences Institute. "Dechlorane Plus High Production Volume (HPV) Chemical Challenge Program Test Plan. 201-15635" (PDF). Archived from the original (PDF) on 2012-10-23.
