= Dieldrin =

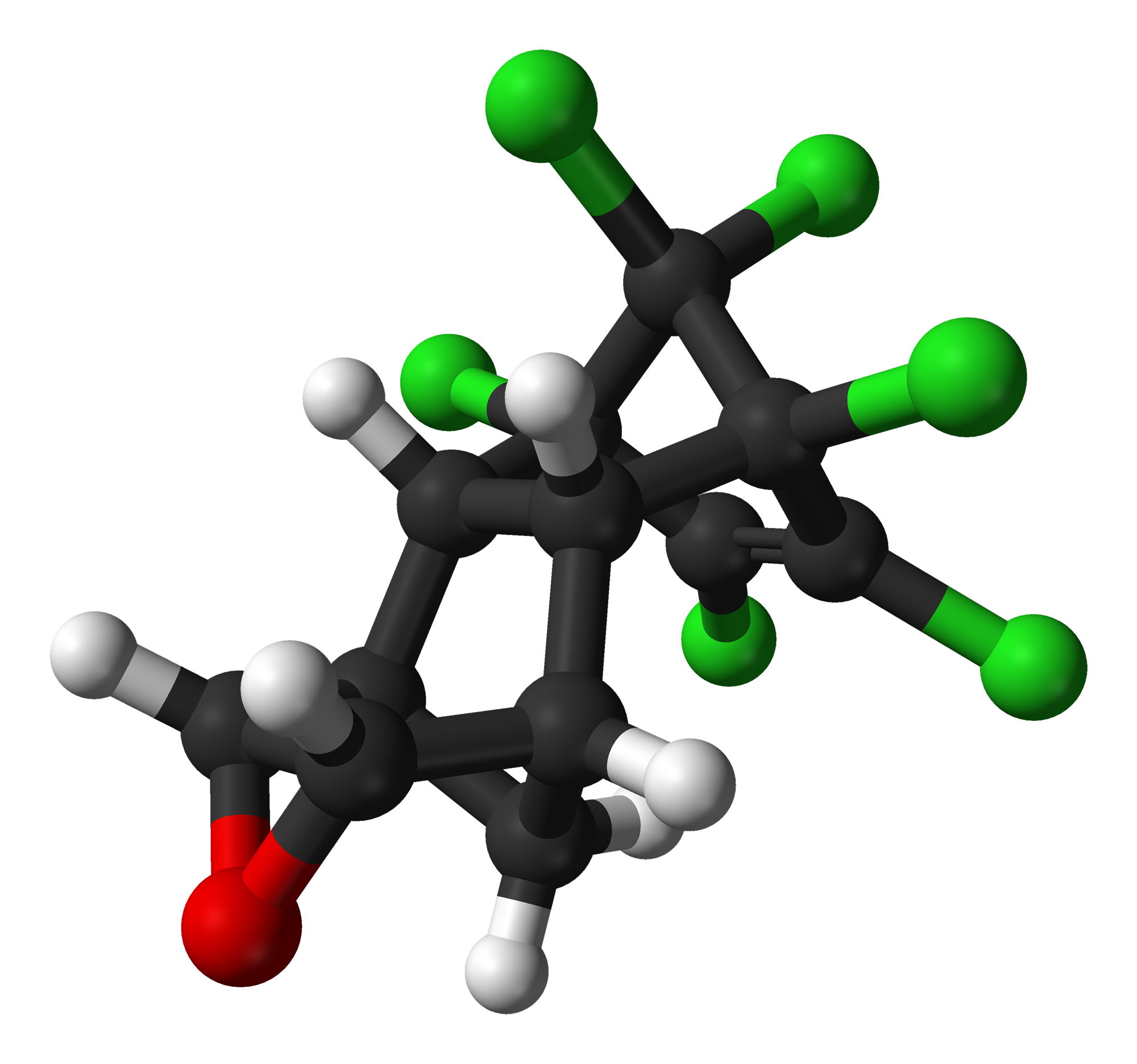

Names
- IUPAC name (1aR,2R,2aS,3S,6R,6aR,7S,7aS)-3,4,5,6,9,9-hexachloro-1a,2,2a,3,6,6a,7,7a-octahydro-2,7:3,6-dimethanonaphtho[2,3-b]oxirene
- Other names Dieldrin, HEOD

Identifiers
CAS Number	60-57-1
3D model (JSmol)	Interactive image
ChEBI	CHEBI:34696
ChEMBL	ChEMBL481118
ChemSpider	10292746
ECHA InfoCard	100.000.440
KEGG	C13718
PubChem CID	969491
UNII	I0246D2ZS0
CompTox Dashboard (EPA)	DTXSID9020453
- InChI: InChI=1S/C12H8Cl6O/c13-8-9(14)11(16)5-3-1-2(6-7(3)19-6)4(5)10(8,15)12(11,17)18/h2-7H,1H2/t2-,3+,4+,5-,6-,7+,10+,11- Key: DFBKLUNHFCTMDC-PICURKEMSA-N; InChI=1/C12H8Cl6O/c13-8-9(14)11(16)5-3-1-2(6-7(3)19-6)4(5)10(8,15)12(11,17)18/h2-7H,1H2/t2-,3+,4+,5-,6-,7+,10+,11- Key: DFBKLUNHFCTMDC-PICURKEMBL
- SMILES: ClC5(Cl)[C@]3(Cl)C(\Cl)=C(\Cl)[C@@]5(Cl)[C@H]4[C@H]1C[C@H]([C@@H]2O[C@H]12)[C@@H]34

Properties
Chemical formula	C_{12}H_{8}Cl_{6}O
Molar mass	380.91 g/mol
Appearance	colorless to light tan crystals
Density	1.75 g/cm^{3}
Melting point	176 to 177 °C (349 to 351 °F; 449 to 450 K)
Boiling point	385 °C (725 °F; 658 K)
Solubility in water	0.02%

Hazards
- Occupational safety and health (OHS/OSH)
Main hazards	moderately toxic and a suspected carcinogen
Flash point	noncombustible
- Lethal dose or concentration (LD, LC)
LD_{50} (median dose)	45 mg/kg (oral, rabbit); 49 mg/kg (oral, guinea pig); 38 mg/kg (oral, mouse); 65 mg/kg (oral, dog); 38 mg/kg (oral, rat)
LC_{50} (median concentration)	80 mg/m^{3} (cat, 4 hr); 13 mg/m^{3} (rat, 4 hr)
- NIOSH (US health exposure limits)
PEL (Permissible)	TWA 0.25 mg/m^{3} [skin]
REL (Recommended)	Ca TWA 0.25 mg/m^{3} [skin]
IDLH (Immediate danger)	Ca [50 mg/m^{3}]
- Except where otherwise noted, data are given for materials in their standard state (at 25 °C [77 °F], 100 kPa). verify (what is ?) Infobox references

Dieldrin is an organochlorine compound originally produced in 1948 by J. Hyman & Co, Denver, as an insecticide. Dieldrin is closely related to aldrin, which reacts further to form dieldrin. Aldrin is not toxic to insects; it is oxidized in the insect to form dieldrin which is the active compound. Both dieldrin and aldrin are named after the Diels–Alder reaction which is used to form aldrin from a mixture of norbornadiene and hexachlorocyclopentadiene.

Originally developed in the 1940s as an alternative to DDT, dieldrin proved to be a highly effective insecticide and was very widely used during the 1950s to early 1970s. Endrin is a stereoisomer of dieldrin.

When concerns started to be raised into the safety of dieldrin in the 1960s, the leading manufacturer, Shell Chemicals, conducted in house research to prove its safety. Conducted at Shell's Tunstall Laboratory, in Sittingbourne in southern England, thirteen volunteers were subjected to up to ten times the amount of dieldrin found in farmed food, and Shell reported 'no apparent effect on their health.'

However, independent research has shown it is an extremely persistent organic pollutant; it does not easily break down. Furthermore, it tends to biomagnify as it is passed along the food chain. Long-term exposure has proven toxic to a very wide range of animals including humans, far greater than to the original insect targets. People who on purpose or accidentally ate large amounts of aldrin or dieldrin have suffered convulsions (spasms), and some died. Workers who were exposed to lower amounts of these chemicals, but for a longer period of time, had headaches, dizziness, irritability, vomiting, and uncontrolled muscle movement. For this reason, it is now banned in most of the world.

It has been linked to health problems such as Parkinson's disease, breast cancer, and immune, reproductive, and nervous system damage. It is also an endocrine disruptor, acting as an estrogen and antiandrogen, and can adversely affect testicle development in the fetus.

== Production ==
Dieldrin can be formed from the Diels–Alder reaction of hexachloro-1,3-cyclopentadiene with norbornadiene followed by epoxidation of the addition product with a peroxy acid such as peracetic acid.

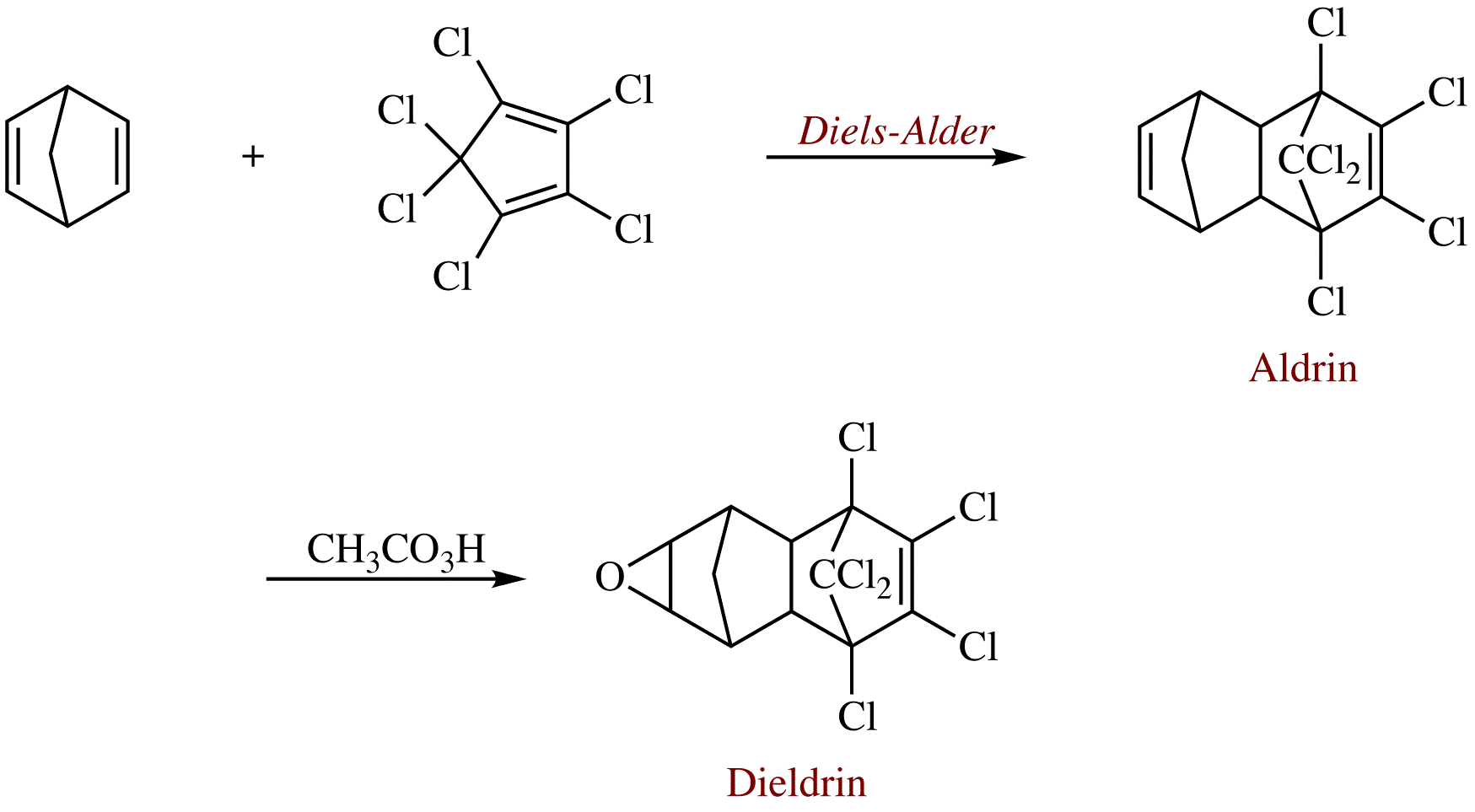
Synthesis of dieldrin

Technical dieldrin contains 5-15% related polychloroepoxyoctahydro- dimethanonaphthalenes. The estimated combined production volume of aldrin and dieldrin in the US peaked in the mid-1960s at about 20 million pounds a year (2 million pounds of dieldrin) and then declined.

== Use ==
The chemicals dieldrin and aldrin were widely applied in agricultural areas throughout the world. They are synthetic organochlorine cyclodiene pesticides used to control subterranean insect pests such as nargles root maggots, mole cricket grubs and weevils, in agriculture. Both are toxic and bioaccumulative. Aldrin does break down to dieldrin in living systems, but dieldrin is known to resist bacterial and chemical breakdown processes in the environment. Both dieldrin and aldrin have been banned (see Legislation and history below).

Aldrin was used to control soil pests (mainly termites) on corn and potato crops. Dieldrin was an insecticide used on fruit, soil, and seed. It persists in the soil with a half-life of five years at temperate latitudes. Both aldrin and dieldrin may be volatilized from sediment and redistributed by air currents, contaminating areas far from their sources. They have been measured in Arctic wildlife, suggesting long range transport from southern agricultural regions.

== Metabolism ==
The metabolism of dieldrin occurs by various routes. Hydration of the epoxy group by epoxide hydrolases leads to formation of the trans-diol and to the dicarboxylic acid. The diol is the most important metabolite produced by the rabbit. In the rat, the primary route of metabolism is hydroxylation of the CH_{2} group by liver microsomal monooxygenases, leading to production of 9-hydroxydieldrin. There is hydrogen bonding between the OH and the epoxy group. It is excreted in the faeces. It is likely that this is an example of enterohepatic recirculation, for bile contains the glucuronide. This is probably cleaved by gut microflora.

There is an interesting metabolite in rat urine, first described by Klein. The methylene group of the dieldrin links to one end of the ClC:CCl group to form a cage structure. The other end of the original ClC:CCl is converted to a ketone. The same metabolite is produced from the photoisomer of dieldrin, in which the same cage structure is produced, but the other end of the original chlorinated double bond forms a CHCl group.

== Legislation and history ==
Both aldrin and dieldrin have been banned in most developed countries, but aldrin is still used as a termiticide in Malaysia, Thailand, Venezuela and parts of Africa. In Canada, their sale was restricted in the mid-1970s, with the last registered use of the compounds in Canada being withdrawn in 1984.

The International Programme on Chemical Safety quotes the World Health Organization as stating dieldrin is prohibited for use in agriculture in, among others, Brazil, Ecuador, Finland, the German Democratic Republic, Singapore, Sweden, Yugoslavia, and the USSR. The European Community legislation prohibits the marketing of phytopharmaceutical products containing dieldrin. In Argentina, Canada, Chile, the Federal Republic of Germany, Hungary, and the US, its use is prohibited, with some exceptions. The use of dieldrin is restricted in India, Mauritius, Togo, and the United Kingdom. Its use in industry is prohibited in Switzerland and its manufacture and use in Japan is under government control. In Finland, the only accepted use for dieldrin is as a termiticide in one glue mixture for exported plywood. India requires registration and licences for all importation, manufacture, sale, or storage.

Momentum against organochlorine and similar molecules continued to grow internationally, leading to negotiations that matured as the Stockholm Convention on Persistent Organic Pollutants(POPs). POPs are defined as hazardous and environmentally persistent substances which can be transported between countries by the Earth's oceans and atmosphere.

Most POPs (including dieldrin) bioaccumulate in the fatty tissues of humans and other animals. The Stockholm Convention banned twelve POPs, nicknamed "the dirty dozen". These include aldicarb, toxaphene, chlordane and heptachlor, chlordimeform, chlorobenzilate, DBCP, DDT, "drins" (aldrin, dieldrin and endrin), EDB, HCH and lindane, paraquat, parathion and methylparathion, pentachlorophenol, and 2,4,5-T. This took force on 17 May 2004. Australia ratified the Convention only three days later and became a party to it in August that year. Legislation in Australia on the import, use and disposal of dieldrin and other organochlorines has been extensive and covers mainly environmental and potential health impacts on the population.

== Australia ==
The use of organochlorines in Australia was dramatically lowered between the mid-1970s and the early 1980s. The first restrictions on the use of dieldrin and related chemicals in Australia were introduced in 1961–2, with registration required for their use on produce animals, such as cattle and chickens. This coincided with increasing concerns worldwide about the long-term effects of persistent pesticides. The publication of Silent Spring (an account of the environmental and health effects of pesticides) by Rachel Carson in 1962 was a key driving force in raising this concern. The phase-out process was driven by government bans and deregistration, in turn promoted by changing public perceptions that food containing residues of these chemicals was less acceptable and possibly hazardous to health.

Throughout this time, continuous pressure was maintained by relevant committees, for example the Technical Committee on Agricultural Chemicals (TCAC), to reduce approved organochlorine use. By 1981, the use of dieldrin worldwide was limited to sugarcane and bananas, and these uses were deregistered by 1985. In 1987, a nationwide recall system was put into place, and in December of that year, the government prohibited all imports of these chemicals into Australia without express ministerial approval. In 1994, the National Registration Authority for Agricultural and Veterinary Chemicals published a use of organochlorines in termite control, recommending the phase-out of organochlorines used in termite control upon development of viable alternatives. The same year, the Agriculture and Resource Management Council of Australia and New Zealand decided to phase out remaining organochlorine uses by 30 June 1995, with the exception of the Northern Territory. In November 1997, the use of all organochlorines other than mirex was phased out in Australia. Remaining stocks of mirex are to be used only for contained baits for termites in plantations of young trees in the Northern Territory until stocks run out, which is expected in the near future.

The recognition of negative impacts on health has stimulated the implementation of multiple legislative policies in regards to the use and disposal of organochlorine pesticides. For example, the Environment Protection (Marine) Policy 1994 became operational in May 1995 in South Australia. It dictated the acceptable concentration of toxicants such as dieldrin in marine waters and the manner in which these levels must be tested and tried.
