= Dihydrofuran =

Dihydrofuran may refer to:

- 2,3-Dihydrofuran
- 2,5-Dihydrofuran
