= Chlordane =

Organic chlorine pesticide (U.S. used 1948–1988)

cis-chlordane (α-chlordane)
trans-chlordane (γ-chlordane, beta-chlordane)
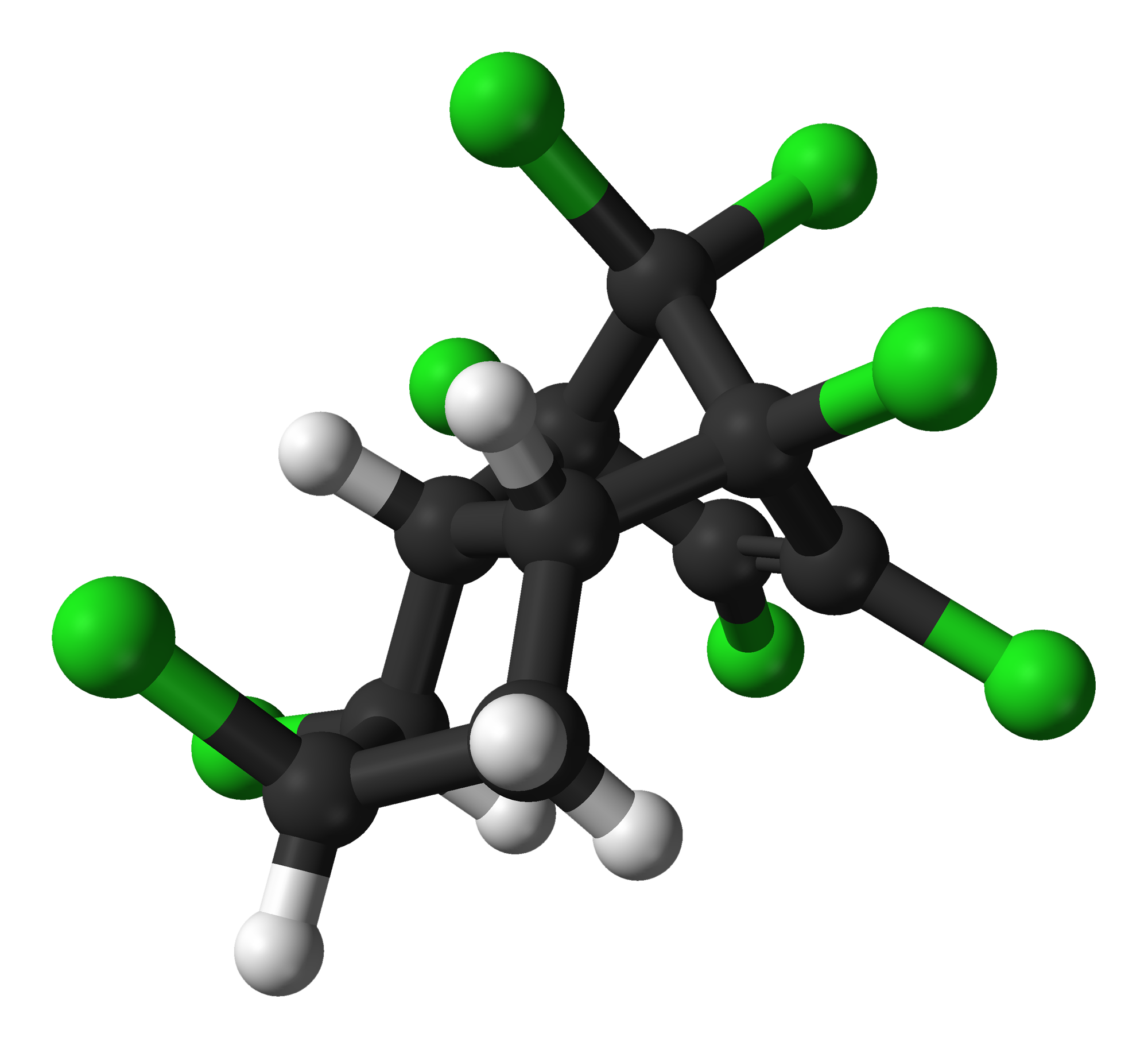
cis-chlordane
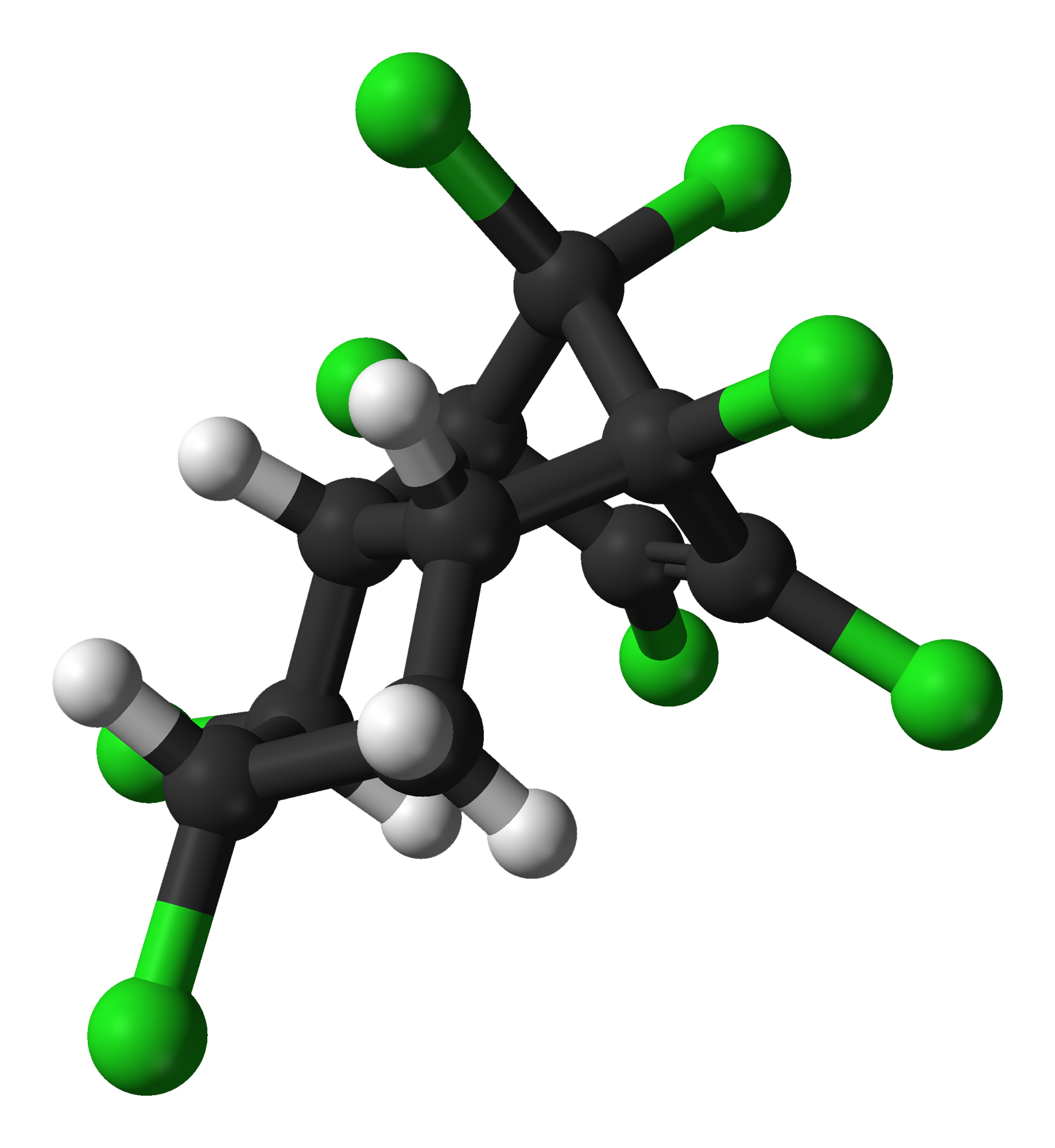
trans-chlordane

Names
- Systematic IUPAC name 1,2,4,5,6,7,8,8-Octachloro-3a,4,7,7a-tetrahydro-4,7-methanoindane
- Other names Chlordan; Chlordano; Ortho; Octachloro-4,7-methanohydroindane

Identifiers
CAS Number	57-74-9
3D model (JSmol)	Interactive image
ChEBI	CHEBI:34623
ChemSpider	5772
ECHA InfoCard	100.000.317
EC Number	200-349-0
IUPHAR/BPS	2831
KEGG	C14176
PubChem CID	5993
UNII	A9RLM212CY
UN number	2996 2762
CompTox Dashboard (EPA)	DTXSID7020267
- InChI: InChI=1S/C10H6Cl8/c11-3-1-2-4(5(3)12)9(16)7(14)6(13)8(2,15)10(9,17)18/h2-5H,1H2 Key: BIWJNBZANLAXMG-UHFFFAOYSA-N
- SMILES: C1C2C(C(C1Cl)Cl)C3(C(=C(C2(C3(Cl)Cl)Cl)Cl)Cl)Cl

Properties
Chemical formula	C_{10}H_{6}Cl_{8}
Molar mass	409.76 g·mol^{−1}
Appearance	White solid
Odor	Slightly pungent, chlorine-like
Density	1.59 g/cm^{3}
Melting point	102–106 °C (216–223 °F; 375–379 K)
Boiling point	decomposes
Solubility in water	0.0001% (20°C)
Refractive index (n_{D})	1.565

Hazards
- Occupational safety and health (OHS/OSH)
Main hazards	moderately toxic and a suspected human carcinogen
- GHS labelling
Pictograms	(GHS06: Toxic) (GHS08: Health hazard) (GHS09: Environmental hazard)
Signal word	Danger
Hazard statements	H301, H311, H351, H410
Precautionary statements	P201, P273, P280, P301+P310+P330, P302+P352+P312
Flash point	107 °C (225 °F; 380 K) (open cup)
Explosive limits	0.7–5%
- Lethal dose or concentration (LD, LC)
LD_{50} (median dose)	100–300 mg/kg (rabbit, oral); 145–430 mg/kg (mouse, oral); 200–590 mg/kg (rat, oral); 1720 mg/kg (hamster, oral)
- NIOSH (US health exposure limits)
PEL (Permissible)	TWA 0.5 mg/m^{3} [skin]
REL (Recommended)	Ca TWA 0.5 mg/m^{3} [skin]
IDLH (Immediate danger)	100 mg/m^{3}
Safety data sheet (SDS)	Chlordane (technical mixture)
- Except where otherwise noted, data are given for materials in their standard state (at 25 °C [77 °F], 100 kPa). verify (what is ?) Infobox references

Chlordane, or chlordan, is an organochlorine compound that was used as a pesticide. It is a white solid. In the United States, chlordane was used for termite-treatment of approximately 30 million homes until it was banned in 1988. Chlordane was banned 10 years earlier for food crops like corn and citrus, and on lawns and domestic gardens.

Like other chlorinated cyclodiene insecticides, chlordane is classified as an organic pollutant hazardous for human health. It is resistant to degradation in the environment and in humans/animals and readily accumulates in lipids (fats) of humans and animals. Exposure to the compound has been linked to cancers, diabetes, and neurological disorders.

== Production, composition and uses ==
Technical chlordane development was by chance at Velsicol Chemical Corporation by Julius Hyman in 1948, during a search for possible uses of a by-product of synthetic rubber manufacturing. By chlorinating this by-product, persistent and potent insecticides were easily and cheaply produced. The chlorine atoms, 7 in the case of heptachlor, 8 in chlordane, and 9 in the case of nonachlor, surround and stabilize the cyclodiene ring and thus these compounds are referred to as cyclodienes. Other members of the cyclodiene family of organochlorine insecticides are aldrin and its epoxide, dieldrin, as well as endrin, which is a stereoisomer of dieldrin. Cyclodiene derives its name from hexachlorocyclopentadiene, a precursor in its production.

Synthesis of cis- (above) and trans-chlordane (below)

Hexachlorocyclopentadiene forms a Diels-Alder adduct with cyclopentadiene to give chlordene intermediate [3734-48-3]; chlorination of this adduct gives predominantly two chlordane isomers, α and β, in addition to other products such as trans-nonachlor and heptachlor. The β-isomer is popularly known as gamma and is more bioactive. The mixture that is composed of 147 components is called technical chlordane.

cis-chlordane (also known as α-chlordane (CAS=5103-71-9))

trans-chlordane (also known as γ-chlordane and gamma-chlordane (CAS=5103-74-2))

trans-nonachlor

(+)-heptachlor

Chlordane appears as a white or off-white crystals when synthesized, but it was more commonly sold in various formulations as oil solutions, emulsions, sprays, dusts, and powders. These products were sold in the United States from 1948 to 1988.

Because of concern for harm to human health and to the environment, the United States Environmental Protection Agency (EPA) banned all uses of chlordane in 1983, except termite control in wooden structures (e.g. houses). After many reports of chlordane in the indoor air of treated homes, EPA banned the remaining use of chlordane in 1988. The EPA recommends that children should not drink water with more than 60 parts of chlordane per billion parts of drinking water (60 ppb) for longer than 1 day. EPA has set a limit in drinking water of 2 ppb.

Chlordane is very persistent in the environment because it does not break down easily. Tests of the air in the residence of U.S. government housing, 32 years after chlordane treatment, showed levels of chlordane and heptachlor 10-15 times the Minimal Risk Levels (20 nanograms/cubic meter of air) published by the Centers for Disease Control. It has an environmental half-life of 10 to 20 years.

== Origin, pathways of exposure, and processes of excretion ==
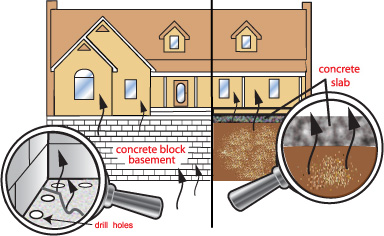
Sources and pathways that chlordane contaminates the indoor air of American homes

In the years 1948–1988 chlordane was a common pesticide for corn and citrus crops, as well as a method of home termite control. Pathways of exposure to chlordane include ingestion of crops grown in chlordane-contaminated soil, inhalation of air in chlordane-treated homes and from landfills, and ingestion of high-fat foods such as meat, fish, and dairy, as chlordane builds up in fatty tissue. The United States Environmental Protection Agency reported that over 30 million homes were treated with technical chlordane or technical chlordane with heptachlor. Depending on the site of home treatment, the indoor air levels of chlordane can still exceed the Minimal Risks Levels (MRLs) for both cancer and chronic disease by orders of magnitude. Chlordane is excreted slowly through feces, urine elimination, and through breast milk in nursing mothers. It is able to cross the placenta and become absorbed by developing fetuses in pregnant women. A breakdown product of chlordane, the metabolite oxychlordane, accumulates in blood and adipose tissue with age.

== Environmental impact ==
Being hydrophobic, chlordane adheres to soil particles and enters groundwater only slowly, owing to its low solubility (0.009 ppm). It requires many years to degrade. Chlordane bioaccumulates in animals. It is highly toxic to fish, with an LD_{50} of 0.022–0.095 mg/kg (oral).

Oxychlordane (C_{10}H_{4}Cl_{8}O), the primary metabolite of chlordane, and heptachlor epoxide, the primary metabolite of heptachlor, along with the two other main components of the chlordane mixture, cis-nonachlor and trans-nonachlor, are the main bioaccumulating constituents. trans-Nonachlor is more toxic than technical chlordane and cis-nonachlor is less toxic.

Chlordane and heptachlor are known as persistent organic pollutants (POP), classified among the "dirty dozen" and banned by the 2001 Stockholm Convention on Persistent Organic Pollutants.

== Health effects ==
Exposure to chlordane/heptachlor and/or its metabolites (oxychlordane, heptachlor epoxide) are risk factors for type-2 diabetes, for lymphoma, for prostate cancer, for obesity, for testicular cancer, for breast cancer.

An epidemiological study conducted by the National Cancer Institute reported that higher levels of chlordane in dust on the floors of homes were associated with higher rates of non-Hodgkin lymphoma in occupants. Breathing chlordane in indoor air is the main route of exposure for these levels in human tissues. Currently, EPA has defined a concentration of 24 nanogram per cubic meter of air (ng/M^{3}) for chlordane compounds over a 20-year exposure period as the concentration that will increase the probability of cancer by 1 in 1,000,000 persons. This probability of developing cancer increases to 10 in 1,000,000 persons with an exposure of 100 ng/m^{3} and 100 in 1,000,000 with an exposure of 1000 ng/m^{3}.

The non-cancer health effects of chlordane compounds, which include diabetes, insulin resistance, migraines, respiratory infections, immune-system activation, anxiety, depression, blurry vision, confusion, intractable seizures as well as permanent neurological damage, probably affects more people than cancer. Trans-nonachlor and oxychlordane in serum of mothers during gestation has been linked with behaviors associated with autism in offspring at age 4–5. The Agency for Toxic Substances and Disease Registry (ATSDR) has defined a concentration of chlordane compounds of 20 ng/m^{3} as the Minimal Risk Level (MRLs). ATSDR defines Minimal Risk Level as an estimate of daily human exposure to a dose of a chemical that is likely to be without an appreciable risk of adverse non-cancerous effects over a specific duration of exposure.

== Remediation ==
Chlordane was applied under the home/building during treatment for termites and the half-life can be up to 30 years. Chlordane has a low vapor pressure and volatilizes slowly into the air of home/building above. To remove chlordane from indoor air requires either ventilation (Heat Exchange Ventilation) or activated carbon filtration. Chemical remediation of chlordane in soils was attempted by the US Army Corps of Engineers by mixing chlordane with aqueous lime and persulfate. In a phytoremediation study, Kentucky bluegrass and Perennial ryegrass were found to be minimally affected by chlordane, and both were found to take it up into their roots and shoots. Mycoremediation of chlordane in soil have found that contamination levels were reduced. The fungus Phanerochaete chrysosporium has been found to reduce concentrations of chlordane by 21% in water in 30 days and in solids in 60 days.
