= 2,3-Dihydrofuran =

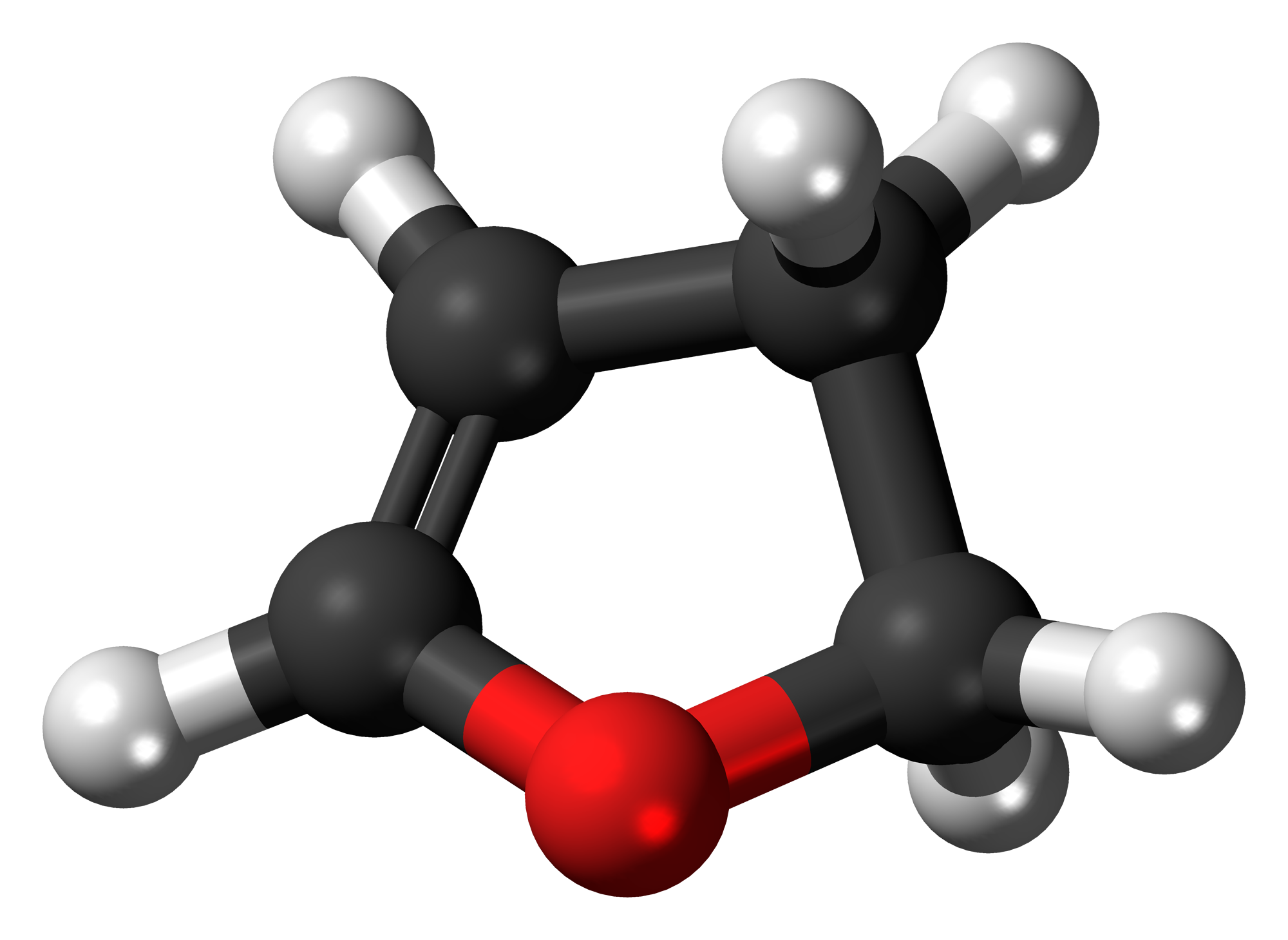

Names
- Preferred IUPAC name 2,3-Dihydrofuran

Identifiers
CAS Number	1191-99-7
3D model (JSmol)	Interactive image
ChEBI	CHEBI:51662
ChemSpider	64096
ECHA InfoCard	100.013.407
PubChem CID	70934
UNII	07M2EY3BG1
CompTox Dashboard (EPA)	DTXSID9061594
- InChI: InChI=1S/C4H6O/c1-2-4-5-3-1/h1,3H,2,4H2 Key: JKTCBAGSMQIFNL-UHFFFAOYSA-N; InChI=1/C4H6O/c1-2-4-5-3-1/h1,3H,2,4H2 Key: JKTCBAGSMQIFNL-UHFFFAOYAF
- SMILES: O1\C=C/CC1

Properties
Chemical formula	C_{4}H_{6}O
Molar mass	70.091 g·mol^{−1}
Density	0,927 g/mL
Boiling point	54.6 °C (130.3 °F; 327.8 K)
- Except where otherwise noted, data are given for materials in their standard state (at 25 °C [77 °F], 100 kPa). verify (what is ?) Infobox references

2,3-Dihydrofuran is a heterocyclic compound with the formula C_{4}H_{6}O. It is isomeric with 2,5-dihydrofuran. 2,3-Dihydrofuran is one of the simplest enol ethers. It is a colorless volatile liquid.

== Reactions ==
It undergoes lithiation upon treatment with butyl lithium. The resulting 2-lithio derivative is a versatile intermediate.

== Synthesis and occurrence ==
2,3-Dihydrofurans are intermediates in the Feist–Benary synthesis of furans from α-halogen ketones and β-dicarbonyl compounds.

The 2,3-dihydrofuran ring can be synthesized by several methods. These routes usually involve cyclization or cycloaddition reactions of carbonyl compounds using metal-containing catalysts. Iodine can also serve as a catalyst as well as Raney nickel.
