= Heptachlor =

- Heptachlor

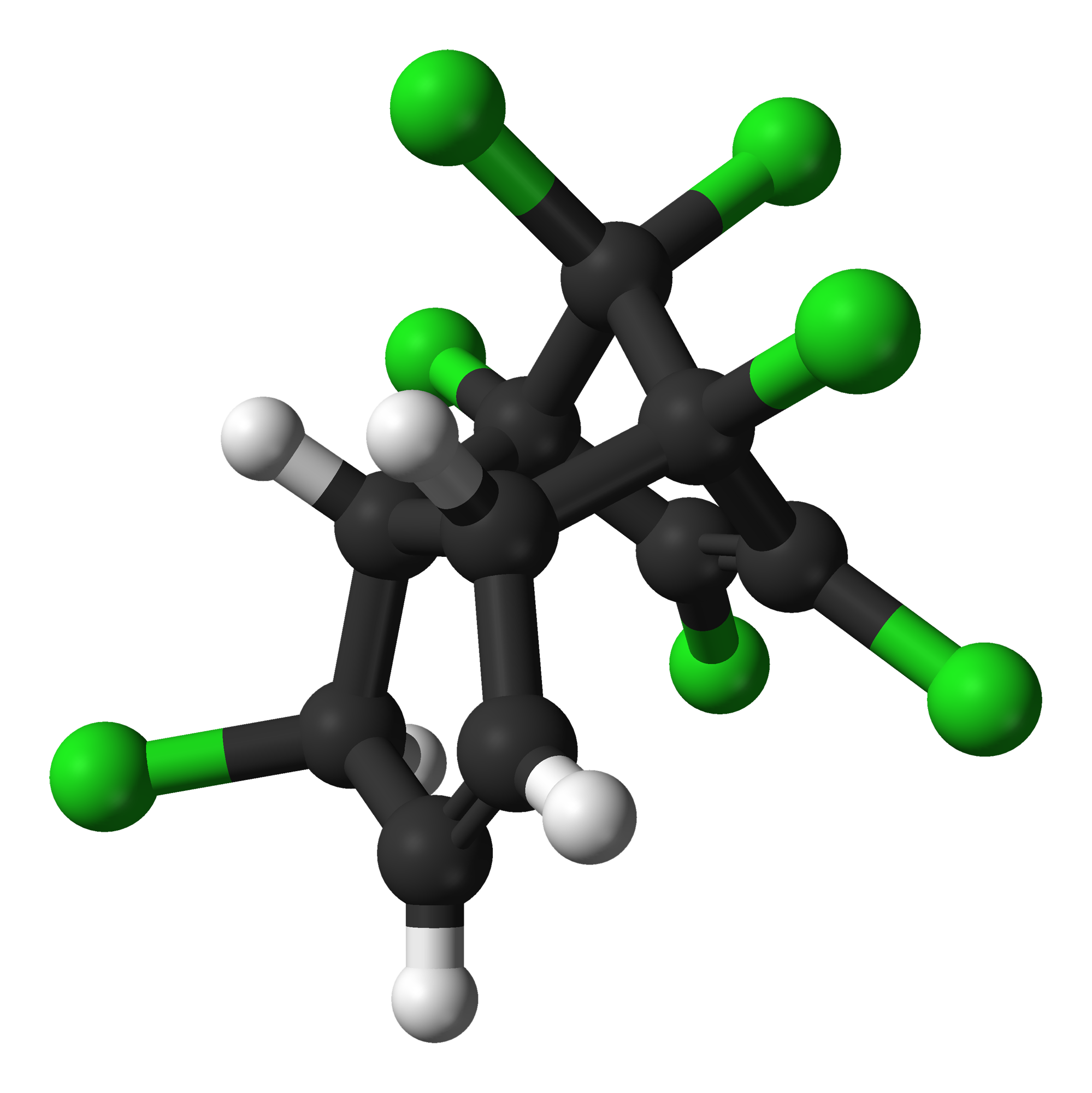
- Ball-and-stick model

Names
- Preferred IUPAC name 1,4,5,6,7,8,8-Heptachloro-3a,4,7,7a-tetrahydro-1H-4,7-methanoindene

Identifiers
CAS Number	76-44-8
3D model (JSmol)	Interactive image
ChEBI	CHEBI:34785
ChEMBL	ChEMBL194400
ChemSpider	3463
ECHA InfoCard	100.000.876
KEGG	C14185
PubChem CID	3589
UNII	7GLS9ACN3L
CompTox Dashboard (EPA)	DTXSID3020679
- InChI: InChI=1S/C10H5Cl7/c11-4-2-1-3-5(4)9(15)7(13)6(12)8(3,14)10(9,16)17/h1-5H Key: FRCCEHPWNOQAEU-UHFFFAOYSA-N; InChI=1/C10H5Cl7/c11-4-2-1-3-5(4)9(15)7(13)6(12)8(3,14)10(9,16)17/h1-5H Key: FRCCEHPWNOQAEU-UHFFFAOYAM
- SMILES: ClC1/C=C\C2C3(Cl)C(\Cl)=C(\Cl)C(Cl)(C12)C3(Cl)Cl

Properties
Chemical formula	C_{10}H_{5}Cl_{7}
Molar mass	373.32 g/mol
Appearance	White to tan solid
Odor	Camphorous
Density	1.58 g/cm^{3}
Melting point	95 to 96 °C (203 to 205 °F; 368 to 369 K)
Boiling point	135 to 145 °C (275 to 293 °F; 408 to 418 K) at 1-1.5 mmHg
Solubility in water	0.0006% (20°C)
Vapor pressure	0.0003 mmHg (25°C)

Hazards
Flash point	noncombustible
- Lethal dose or concentration (LD, LC)
LD_{50} (median dose)	116 mg/kg (oral, guinea pig); 40 mg/kg (oral, rat); 100 mg/kg (oral, rat); 68 mg/kg (oral, mouse); 100 mg/kg (oral, hamster)
LD_{Lo} (lowest published)	50 mg/kg (cat, oral)
LC_{Lo} (lowest published)	150 mg/m^{3} (cat, 4 hr); 200 mg/m^{3} (mammal, 4 hr)
- NIOSH (US health exposure limits)
PEL (Permissible)	TWA 0.5 mg/m^{3} [skin]
REL (Recommended)	Ca TWA 0.5 mg/m^{3} [skin]
IDLH (Immediate danger)	Ca [35 mg/m^{3}]
- Except where otherwise noted, data are given for materials in their standard state (at 25 °C [77 °F], 100 kPa). verify (what is ?) Infobox references

Heptachlor is an organochlorine compound that was used as an insecticide. Usually sold as a white or tan powder, heptachlor is one of the cyclodiene insecticides. In 1962, Rachel Carson's Silent Spring questioned the safety of heptachlor and other chlorinated insecticides. Due to its highly stable structure, heptachlor can persist in the environment for decades. In the United States, the Environmental Protection Agency has limited the sale of heptachlor products to the specific application of fire ant control in underground transformers. The amount that can be present in different foods is regulated.

== Synthesis ==
Analogous to the synthesis of other cyclodienes, heptachlor is produced via the Diels-Alder reaction of hexachlorocyclopentadiene and cyclopentadiene. The resulting adduct is chlorinated followed by treatment with hydrogen chloride in nitromethane in the presence of aluminum trichloride or with iodine monochloride.

Compared to chlordane, it is about 3–5 times more active as an insecticide, but more inert chemically, being resistant to water and caustic alkalies.

== Metabolism ==
Soil microorganisms transform heptachlor by epoxidation, hydrolysis, and reduction. When the compound was incubated with a mixed culture of organisms, chlordene (hexachlorocyclopentadine, its precursor) formed, which was further metabolized to chlordene epoxide. Other metabolites include 1-hydroxychlordene, 1-hydroxy-2,3-epoxychlordene, and heptachlor epoxide. Soil microorganisms hydrolyze heptachlor to give ketochlordene. Rats metabolize heptachlor to the epoxide 1-exo-1-hydroxyheptachlor epoxide and 1,2-dihydrooxydihydrochlordene. When heptachlor epoxide was incubated with microsomal preparations form liver of pigs and from houseflies, the products found were diol and 1-hydroxy-2,3-epoxychlordene. The metabolic scheme in rats shows two pathways with the same metabolite. The first involves: heptachlor → heptachlor epoxide → dehydrogenated derivative of 1-exo-hydroxy-2,3-exo-epoxychlordene → 1,2-dihydrooxydihydrochlordene. The second involves: heptachlor → 1-exo-hydroxychlordene → 1-exo-hydroxy, 2,3-exo-epoxychlordene → 1,2-dihydrooxydihydrochlordene.

== Environmental impact ==
Heptachlor is a persistent organic pollutant (POP). It has a half-life of ~1.3–4.2 days (air), ~0.03–0.11 years (water), and ~0.11–0.34 years (soil). One study described its half-life to be 2 years and claimed that its residues could be found in soil 14 years after its initial application. Like other POPs, heptachlor is lipophilic and poorly soluble in water (0.056 mg/L at 25 °C), thus it tends to accumulate in the body fat of humans and animals.

Heptachlor epoxide is more likely to be found in the environment than its parent compound. The epoxide also dissolves more easily in water than its parent compound and is more persistent. Heptachlor and its epoxide absorb to soil particles and evaporate.

== Toxicity of heptachlor and related derivatives ==
The range of oral rat LD_{50} values are 40 mg/kg to 162 mg/kg. Daily oral doses of heptachlor at 50 and 100 mg/kg were found to be lethal to rats after 10 days. For heptachlor epoxide, the oral LD_{50} values ranging from 46.5 to 60 mg/kg. With rat oral of LD_{50}47mg/kg, heptachlor epoxide is more toxic. A product of hydrogenation of heptachlor, β-dihydroheptachlor, has high insecticidal activity and low mammalian toxicity, rat oral LD_{50}>5,000mg/kg.

== Human impact ==
Humans may be exposed to heptachlor through drinking water and foods, including breast milk. Heptachlor epoxide is derived from a pesticide that was banned in the U.S. in the 1980s. It is still found in soil and water supplies and can turn up in food. It can be passed along in breast milk.

The International Agency for Research on Cancer and the EPA have classified the compound as a possible human carcinogen. Animals exposed to heptachlor epoxide during gestation and infancy are found to have changes in nervous system and immune function. Exposure to higher doses of heptachlor in newborn animals leads to decreased body weight and death.

The U.S. EPA MCL for drinking water is 0.0004 mg/L for heptachlor and 0.0002 mg/L for heptachlor epoxide. The U.S. FDA limit on food crops is 0.01 ppm, in milk 0.1 ppm, and on edible seafoods 0.3 ppm. The Occupational Safety and Health Administration has limit of 0.5 mg/m^{3} (cubic meter of workplace air) for 8-hour shifts and 40-hour work weeks.

An ATSDR report in 1993 found no studies with respect to death in humans after oral exposure to heptachlor or heptachlor epoxide.

== Chemical properties ==
The octanol-water partition coefficient (K_{ow}) of heptachlor is ~10^{5.27}. Henry's Law constant is 2.3 · 10^{−3}atm-m^{3}/mol and the vapor pressure is 3 · 10^{−4}mmHg at 20 °C.
