= OxyChem =

American chemical corporation

- Industry: Chemical manufacturer
- Owner: Berkshire Hathaway
- Website: www.oxychem.com

OxyChem is a chemical manufacturer that was a wholly-owned subsidiary of Oxy (Occidental Petroleum Corporation) until the latter decided to begin negotiating its sale to Berkshire Hathaway in October 2025. The company has expertise in chloralkali and related processes.

On January 2, 2026, Berkshire Hathaway announced that it had completed its acquisition of OxyChem for $9.7 billion.
