= Chlordimeform =

Names
- IUPAC name N′-(4-chloro-2-methylphenyl)-N,N-dimethylmethanimidamide
- Other names Chlorphenamidine; Chlorfenamidine; Fundal; Galecron

Identifiers
| CAS Number | 6164-98-3 |
| 3D model (JSmol) | Interactive image |
| ChemSpider | 10468746 |
| ECHA InfoCard | 100.025.637 |
| KEGG | C14746 |
| PubChem CID | 22544 |
| UNII | GXA8FP6Y9C |
| CompTox Dashboard (EPA) | DTXSID2037508 |
- InChI: InChI=1S/C10H13ClN2/c1-8-6-9(11)4-5-10(8)12-7-13(2)3/h4-7H,1-3H3 Key: STUSTWKEFDQFFZ-UHFFFAOYSA-N; InChI=1/C10H13ClN2/c1-8-6-9(11)4-5-10(8)12-7-13(2)3/h4-7H,1-3H3 Key: STUSTWKEFDQFFZ-UHFFFAOYAO
- SMILES: Clc1cc(C)c(/N=C/N(C)C)cc1

Properties
| Chemical formula | C_{10}H_{13}ClN_{2} |
| Molar mass | 196.68 g·mol^{−1} |
| Appearance | White crystalline solid |
| Melting point | 32 °C (90 °F; 305 K) (225-227 °C, hydrochloride) |
| Boiling point | 163–165 °C |
| Solubility in water | 250 mg/L |
- Except where otherwise noted, data are given for materials in their standard state (at 25 °C [77 °F], 100 kPa). verify (what is ?) Infobox references

Chlordimeform is an acaricide (pesticide) active mainly against motile forms of mites and ticks and against eggs and early instars of some Lepidoptera insects. After the International Agency for Research on Cancer reported sufficient evidence that its major metabolite, 4-chloro-o-toluidine, was a carcinogen, its use has ceased and its registration has been withdrawn in most countries.
