= Drin Valley =

Valley in Albania

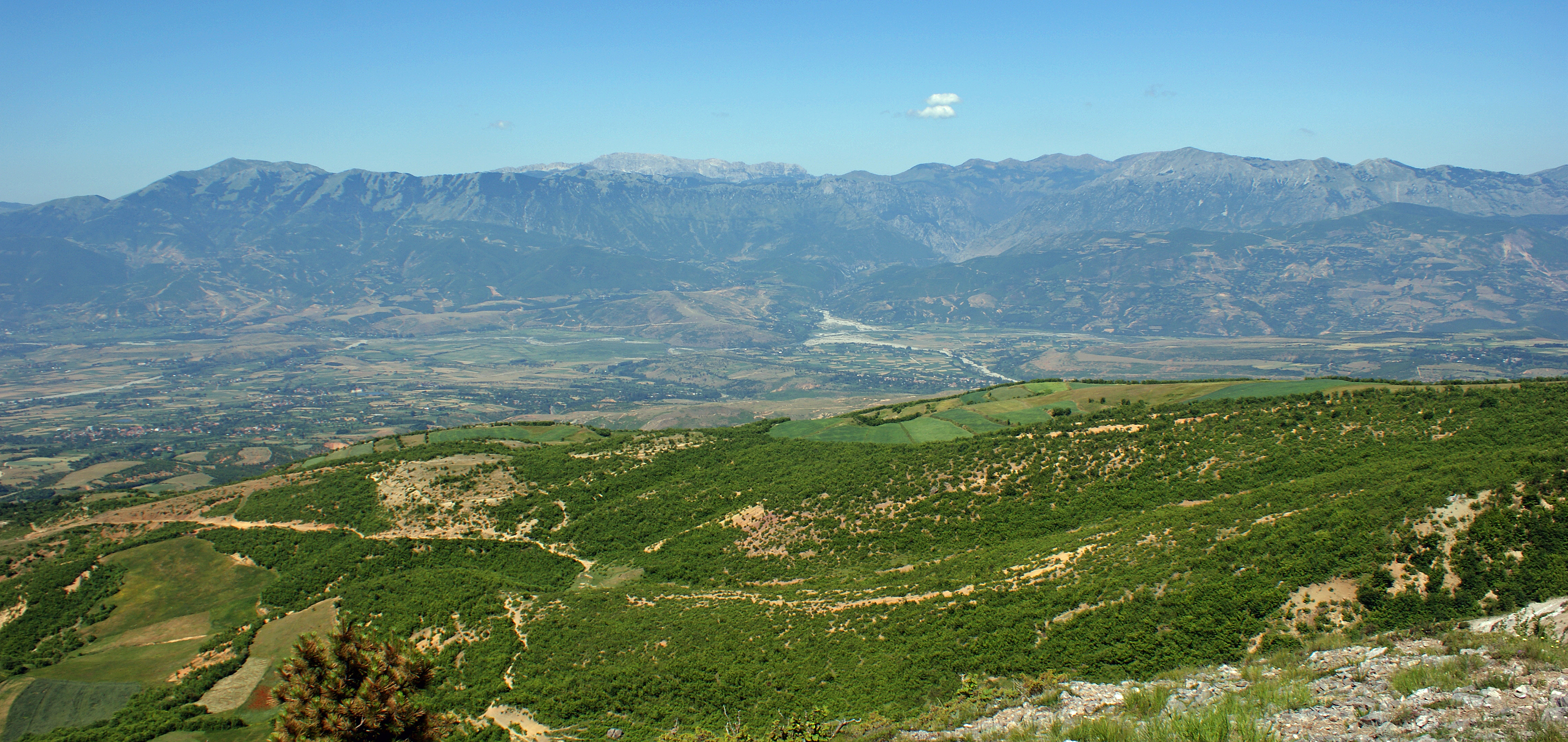
View over the Drin valley in Dibra, Eastern Albania

The Drin Valley (Albanian: Lugina e Drinit) is a valley in northern and eastern Albania along the Drin River.
