= Aldrin =

- Aldrin

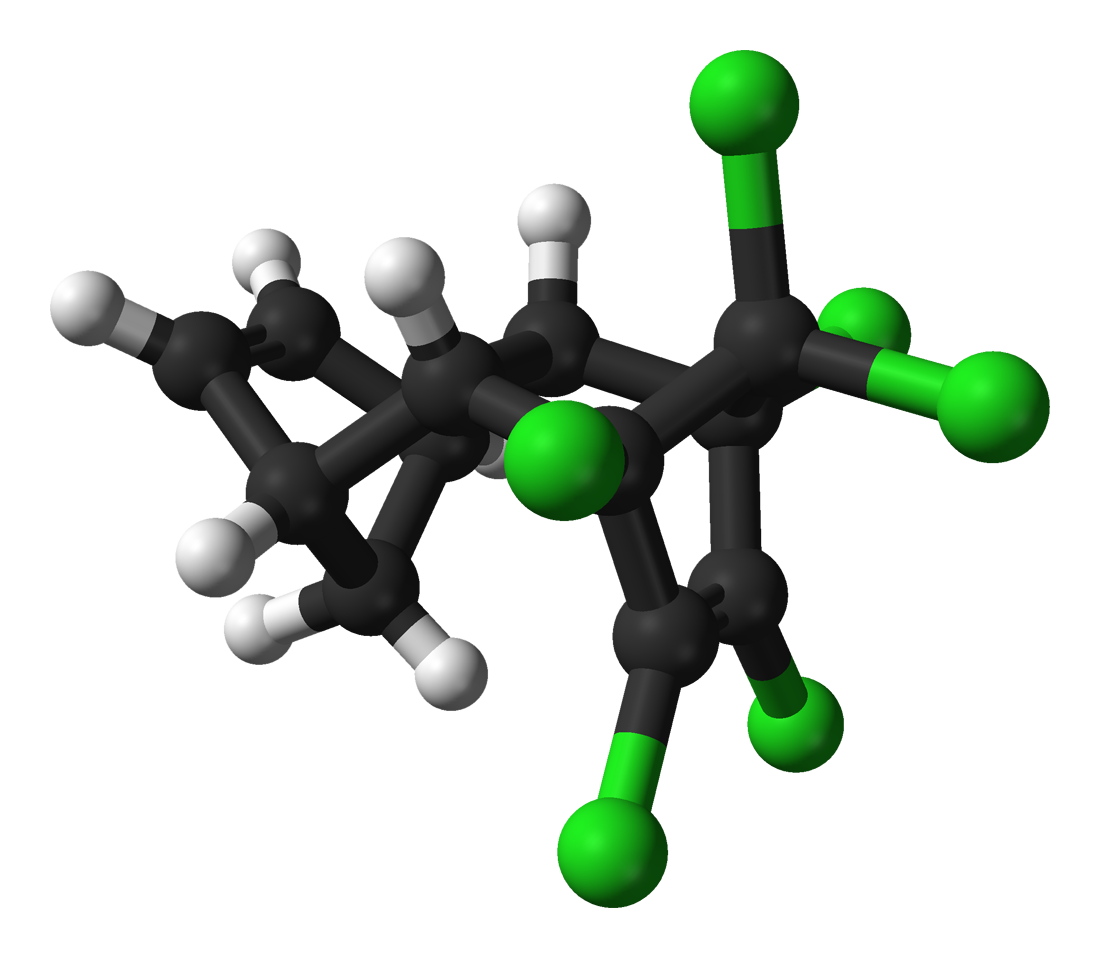

Names
- Preferred IUPAC name (1R,4S,4aS,5S,8R,8aR)-1,2,3,4,10,10-Hexachloro-1,4,4a,5,8,8a-hexahydro-1,4:5,8-dimethanonaphthalene
- Other names HHDN octalene

Identifiers
CAS Number	309-00-2
3D model (JSmol)	Interactive image
ChEBI	CHEBI:2564
ChEMBL	ChEMBL195953
ChemSpider	10292747
ECHA InfoCard	100.005.652
EC Number	206-215-8
KEGG	C07552
PubChem CID	12310947; 12310946
RTECS number	IO2100000
UNII	OZE3CLY605
UN number	2762, 2761
CompTox Dashboard (EPA)	DTXSID8020040
- InChI: InChI=1S/C12H8Cl6/c13-8-9(14)11(16)7-5-2-1-4(3-5)6(7)10(8,15)12(11,17)18/h1-2,4-7H,3H2/t4-,5+,6+,7-,10+,11- Key: QBYJBZPUGVGKQQ-SJJAEHHWSA-N; InChI=1/C12H8Cl6/c13-8-9(14)11(16)7-5-2-1-4(3-5)6(7)10(8,15)12(11,17)18/h1-2,4-7H,3H2/t4-,5+,6+,7-,10+,11- Key: QBYJBZPUGVGKQQ-SJJAEHHWBI
- SMILES: ClC4(Cl)[C@@]2(Cl)C(/Cl)=C(/Cl)[C@]4(Cl)[C@@H]3[C@@H]\1C[C@@H](/C=C/1)[C@H]23

Properties
Chemical formula	C_{12}H_{8}Cl_{6}
Molar mass	364.90 g·mol^{−1}
Appearance	Colorless solid
Density	1.60 g/mL
Melting point	104 °C (219 °F; 377 K)
Solubility in water	slightly soluble (0.003%)
Vapor pressure	7.5 × 10^{−5} mmHg @ 20 °C

Pharmacology
Legal status	AU: S6 (Poison)

Hazards
- Occupational safety and health (OHS/OSH)
Main hazards	Toxic and is a suspected human carcinogen
- GHS labelling
Pictograms	(GHS06: Toxic) (GHS08: Health hazard) (GHS09: Environmental hazard)
Signal word	Danger
Hazard statements	H300, H301, H310, H311, H351, H372, H410
Precautionary statements	P201, P202, P260, P262, P264, P270, P273, P280, P281, P301+P310, P302+P350, P302+P352, P308+P313, P310, P312, P314, P321, P322, P330, P361, P363, P391, P405, P501
NFPA 704 (fire diamond)	4 0 0
Flash point	66 °C (151 °F; 339 K)
- Lethal dose or concentration (LD, LC)
LD_{50} (median dose)	50 mg/kg (rabbit, oral); 33 mg/kg (guinea pig, oral); 39 mg/kg (rat, oral); 44 mg/kg (mouse, oral)
LC_{Lo} (lowest published)	5.8 mg/m^{3} (rat, 4 hr)
- NIOSH (US health exposure limits)
PEL (Permissible)	TWA 0.25 mg/m^{3} [skin]
REL (Recommended)	Ca TWA 0.25 mg/m^{3} [skin]
IDLH (Immediate danger)	25 mg/m^{3}
- Except where otherwise noted, data are given for materials in their standard state (at 25 °C [77 °F], 100 kPa). verify (what is ?) Infobox references

Aldrin is an organochlorine insecticide that was widely used until the 1990s, when it was banned in most countries. Aldrin is a member of the so-called "classic organochlorines" (COC) group of pesticides. COCs enjoyed a very sharp rise in popularity during and after World War II. Other noteworthy examples of COCs include chlordane, dieldrin and DDT. After research showed that organochlorines can be highly toxic to the ecosystem through bioaccumulation, most were banned from use. Before the ban, it was heavily used as a pesticide to treat seed and soil. Aldrin and related "cyclodiene" pesticides (a term for pesticides derived from Hexachlorocyclopentadiene) became notorious as persistent organic pollutants.

== Structure and Reactivity ==
Pure aldrin takes form as a white crystalline powder. Though it is not soluble in water (0.003% solubility), aldrin dissolves very well in organic solvents, such as ketones and paraffins. Aldrin decays very slowly once released into the environment. Though it is rapidly converted to dieldrin by plants and bacteria, dieldrin maintains the same toxic effects and slow decay of aldrin. Aldrin is easily transported through the air by dust particles. Aldrin does not react with mild acids or bases and is stable in an environment with a pH between 4 and 8. It is highly flammable when exposed to temperatures above 200 °C In the presence of oxidizing agents aldrin reacts with concentrated acids and phenols.

== Synthesis ==
Aldrin is not formed in nature. It is named after the German chemist Kurt Alder, one of the coinventors of this kind of reaction. Aldrin is synthesized by combining hexachlorocyclopentadiene with norbornadiene in a Diels-Alder reaction to give the adduct. In 1967, the composition of technical-grade aldrin was reported to consist of 90.5% of hexachlorohexahydrodimethanonaphthalene (HHDN).

Synthesis of aldrin via a Diels-Alder reaction

Similarly, an isomer of aldrin, known as isodrin, is produced by reaction of hexachloronobornadiene with cyclopentadiene. Isodrin is also produced as a byproduct of aldrin synthesis, with technical-grade aldrin containing about 3.5% isodrin.

Isodrin

An estimated 270 million kilograms of aldrin and related cyclodiene pesticides were produced between 1946 and 1976. The estimated production volume of aldrin in the US peaked in the mid-1960s at about 18 million pounds (8.2 kt) a year and then declined.

== Available forms ==
There are multiple available forms of aldrin. One of these is the isomer isodrin, which cannot be found in nature, but needs to be synthesized like aldrin. When aldrin enters the human body or the environment it is rapidly converted to dieldrin. Degradation by ultraviolet radiation or microbes can convert dieldrin to photodieldrin and aldrin to photoaldrin.

== Mechanism of action ==
Even though many toxic effects of aldrin have been discovered, the exact mechanisms underlying the toxicity are yet to be determined. The only toxic aldrin induced process that is largely understood is that of neurotoxicity.

=== Neurotoxicity ===
One of the effects that intoxication with aldrin gives rise to is neurotoxicity. Studies have shown that aldrin stimulates the central nervous system (CNS), which may cause hyperexcitation and seizures. This phenomenon exerts its effect through two different mechanisms.

One of the mechanisms uses the ability of aldrin to inhibit brain calcium ATPases. These ion pumps relieve the nerve terminal from calcium by actively pumping it out. However, when aldrin inhibits these pumps, the intracellular calcium levels rise. This results in an enhanced neurotransmitter release.

The second mechanism makes use of aldrin's ability to block gamma-aminobutyric acid (GABA) activity. GABA is a major inhibitory neurotransmitter in the central nervous system. Aldrin induces neurotoxic effects by blocking the GABA_{A} receptor-chloride channel complex. By blocking this receptor, chloride is unable to move into the synapse, which prevents hyperpolarization of neuronal synapses. Therefore, the synapses are more likely to generate action potentials.

== Metabolism ==
The metabolism of oral aldrin exposure has not been studied in humans. However, animal studies are able to provide an extensive overview of the metabolism of aldrin. This data can be related to humans.

Biotransformation of aldrin starts with epoxidation of aldrin by mixed-function oxidases (CYP-450), which forms dieldrin. This conversion happens mainly in the liver. Tissues with low CYP-450 expression use the prostaglandin endoperoxide synthase (PES) instead. This oxidative pathway bisdioxygenises the arachidonic acid to prostaglandin G_{2} (PGG_{2}). Subsequently, PGG_{2} is reduced to prostaglandin H_{2} (PGH_{2}) by hydroperoxidase.

Dieldrin can then be directly oxidized by cytochrome oxidases, which forms 9-hydroxydieldrin. An alternative for oxidation involves the opening of the epoxide ring by epoxide hydrases, which forms the product 6,7-trans-dihydroxydihydroaldrin. Both products can be conjugated to form 6,7-trans-dihydroxydihydroaldrin glucuronide and 9-hydroxydieldrin glucuronide, respectively. 6,7-trans-dihydroxydihydroaldrin can also be oxidized to form aldrin dicarboxylic acid.

== Efficacy and side effects ==
Considering the toxicokinetics of aldrin in the environment, the efficacy of the compound has been determined. In addition, the adverse effects after exposure to aldrin are demonstrated, indicating the risk regarding the compound.

=== Efficacy ===
The ability of aldrin, in its use for the control of termites, is examined in order to determine the maximum response when applied. In 1953 US researchers tested aldrin and dieldrin on terrains with rats known to carry chiggers, at a rate of 2.25 pounds per acre (2.52 kg/ha). The aldrin and dieldrin treatment demonstrated a decrease of 75 times less chiggers on rats for dieldrin treated terrains and 25 times less chiggers on the rats when treated with aldrin. The aldrin treatment indicate a high productivity, especially in comparison to other insecticides that were used at the time, such as DDT, sulfur or lindane.

=== Adverse effects ===
Exposure of aldrin to the environment leads to the localization of the chemical compound in the air, soil, and water. Aldrin gets changed quickly to dieldrin and that compound degrades slowly, which accounts for aldrin concentrations in the environment around the primary exposure and in the plants. These concentrations can also be found in animals, which eat contaminated plants or animals that reside in the contaminated water. This biomagnification can lead to a high concentrations in their fat.

There are some reported cases of workers who developed anemia after multiple dieldrin exposures. However the main adverse effect of aldrin and dieldrin is in relationship to the central nervous system. The accumulated levels of dieldrin in the body were believed to lead to convulsions. Besides that other symptoms were also reported like headaches, nausea and vomiting, anorexia, muscle twitching and myoclonic jerking and EEG distortions. In all these cases removal of the source of exposure to aldrin/dieldrin led to a rapid recovery.

== Toxicity ==
The toxicity of aldrin and dieldrin is determined by the results of several animal studies. Reports of a significant increase in workers death in relation to aldrin has not been found, although death by anemia is reported in some cases after multiple exposure to aldrin. Immunological tests linked an antigenic response to erythrocytes coated with dieldrin in those cases. Direct dose-response relations being a cause for death are yet to be examined.

The NOAEL that was derived from rat studies:

- The minimal risk level at acute oral exposure to aldrin is 0.002 mg/kg/day.
- The minimal risk level at intermediate exposure to dieldrin is 0.0001 mg/kg/day.
- The minimal risk level at chronic exposure to aldrin is 0.00003 mg/kg/day.
- The minimal risk level at chronic exposure to dieldrin is 0.00005 mg/kg/day.

In addition to these studies, breast cancer risk studies were performed demonstrating a significant increased breast cancer risk. After comparing blood concentrations to number of lymph nodes and tumor size a 5-fold higher risk of death was determined, comparing the highest quartile range in the research to the lower quartile range.

=== Effects on animals ===
Most of the animal studies done with aldrin and dieldrin used rats. High doses of aldrin and dieldrin demonstrated neurotoxicity, but in multiple rat studies also showed a unique sensitivity of the mouse liver to dieldrin induced hepatocarcinogenicity. Furthermore, aldrin treated rats demonstrated an increased post-natal mortality, in which adults showed an increased susceptibility to the compounds compared to children in rats.

== Environmental impact and regulation ==
Like related polychlorinated pesticides, aldrin is highly lipophilic. Its solubility in water is only 0.027 mg/L, which exacerbates its persistence in the environment. It was banned by the Stockholm Convention on Persistent Organic Pollutants. In the U.S., aldrin was cancelled in 1974. The substance is banned from use for plant protection by the EU.

== Safety and environmental aspects ==
Aldrin has rat LD_{50} of 39 to 60 mg/kg (oral in rats). For fish however, it is extremely toxic, with an LC_{50} of 0.006–0.01 for trout and bluegill.

In the US, aldrin is considered a potential occupational carcinogen by the Occupational Safety and Health Administration and the National Institute for Occupational Safety and Health; these agencies have set an occupational exposure limit for dermal exposures at 0.25 mg/m^{3} over an eight-hour time-weighted average. Further, an IDLH limit has been set at 25 mg/m^{3}, based on acute toxicity data in humans to which subjects reacted with convulsions within 20 minutes of exposure.

It is classified as an extremely hazardous substance in the United States as defined in Section 302 of the U.S. Emergency Planning and Community Right-to-Know Act (42 U.S.C. 11002), and is subject to strict reporting requirements by facilities which produce, store, or use it in significant quantities.
