= Organochlorine chemistry =

Organic compound containing at least one covalent carbon-chlorine bond

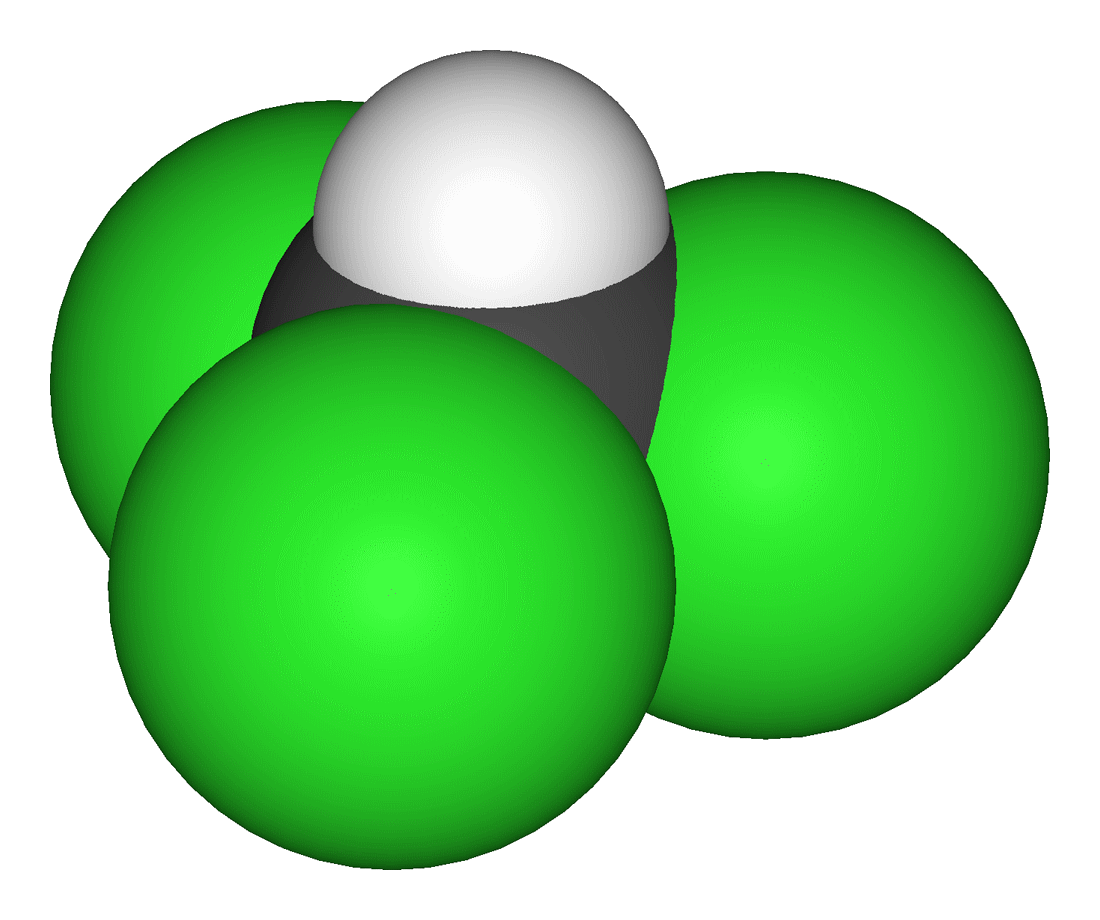
Two representations of chloroform.

Organochlorine chemistry is concerned with the properties of organochlorine compounds, or organochlorides, organic compounds that contain one or more carbon–chlorine bonds. The chloroalkane class (alkanes with one or more hydrogens substituted by chlorine) includes common examples. The wide structural variety and divergent chemical properties of organochlorides lead to a broad range of names, applications, and properties. Organochlorine compounds have wide use in many applications, though some are of profound environmental concern, with DDT and TCDD being among the most notorious.

Organochlorides such as trichloroethylene, tetrachloroethylene, dichloromethane and chloroform are commonly used as solvents and are referred to as "chlorinated solvents".

== Physical and chemical properties ==
Chlorination modifies the physical properties of hydrocarbons in several ways. These compounds are typically denser than water due to the higher atomic weight of chlorine versus hydrogen. They have higher boiling and melting points compared to related hydrocarbons. Flammability reduces with increased chlorine substitution in hydrocarbons.

Aliphatic organochlorides are often alkylating agents as chlorine can act as a leaving group, which can result in cellular damage.

== Natural occurrence ==
Many organochlorine compounds have been isolated from natural sources ranging from bacteria to humans (e.g 3-chlorotyrosine). Chlorinated organic compounds are found in nearly every class of biomolecules and natural products including alkaloids, terpenes, amino acids, flavonoids, steroids, and fatty acids. Dioxins, which are of particular concern to human and environmental health, are produced in the high temperature environment of forest fires and have been found in the preserved ashes of lightning-ignited fires that predate synthetic dioxins. In addition, a variety of simple chlorinated hydrocarbons including dichloromethane, chloroform, and carbon tetrachloride have been isolated from macroalgae. A majority of the chloromethane in the environment is produced naturally by microbial communities, forest fires, and volcanoes.

The natural organochloride epibatidine, an alkaloid isolated from tree frogs, has potent analgesic effects and has stimulated research into new pain medication. However, because of its unacceptable therapeutic index, it is no longer a subject of research for potential therapeutic uses. The frogs obtain epibatidine through their diet which is then sequestered into their skin. Likely dietary sources are beetles, ants, mites, and flies.

== Preparation ==
=== From chlorine ===
Alkanes and aryl alkanes may be chlorinated under free radical conditions, with UV light. However, the extent of chlorination is difficult to control. Aryl chlorides may be prepared by the Friedel–Crafts reaction, using chlorine and a Lewis acid catalyst.

The haloform reaction, using chlorine and sodium hydroxide, is also able to generate alkyl halides from methyl ketones, and related compounds. Chloroform was formerly produced thus.

Chlorine adds to the multiple bonds on alkenes and alkynes as well, giving di- or tetra-chloro compounds.

=== Reaction with hydrogen chloride ===
Alkenes react with hydrogen chloride (HCl) to give alkyl chlorides. For example, the industrial production of chloroethane proceeds by the reaction of ethylene with HCl:

H_{2}C=CH_{2} + HCl → CH_{3}CH_{2}Cl

In oxychlorination, hydrogen chloride instead of the more expensive chlorine is used for the same purpose:

CH_{2}=CH_{2} + 2 HCl + 1/2 O_{2} → ClCH_{2}CH_{2}Cl + H_{2}O.

Secondary and tertiary alcohols react with hydrogen chloride to give the corresponding chlorides. In the laboratory, the related reaction involving zinc chloride in concentrated hydrochloric acid:

$$\ce{{R-OH} + HCl ->[\ce{ZnCl2}] [\Delta] \overset{alkyl\ halide}{R-Cl} + H2O}$$

Called the Lucas reagent, this mixture was once used in qualitative organic analysis for classifying alcohols.

=== Other chlorinating agents ===
Alkyl chlorides are most easily prepared by treating alcohols with thionyl chloride (SOCl_{2}) or phosphorus pentachloride (PCl_{5}), but also commonly with sulfuryl chloride (SO_{2}Cl_{2}) and phosphorus trichloride (PCl_{3}):

ROH + SOCl_{2} → RCl + SO_{2} + HCl
3 ROH + PCl_{3} → 3 RCl + H_{3}PO_{3}
ROH + PCl_{5} → RCl + POCl_{3} + HCl

In the laboratory, thionyl chloride is especially convenient, because the byproducts are gaseous. Alternatively, the Appel reaction can be used:

== Reactions ==
Alkyl chlorides are versatile building blocks in organic chemistry. While alkyl bromides and iodides are more reactive, alkyl chlorides tend to be less expensive and more readily available. Alkyl chlorides readily undergo attack by nucleophiles.

Heating alkyl halides with sodium hydroxide or water gives alcohols. Reaction with alkoxides or aryloxides give ethers in the Williamson ether synthesis; reaction with thiols give thioethers. Alkyl chlorides readily react with amines to give substituted amines. Alkyl chlorides are substituted by softer halides such as the iodide in the Finkelstein reaction. Reaction with other pseudohalides such as azide, cyanide, and thiocyanate are possible as well. In the presence of a strong base, alkyl chlorides undergo dehydrohalogenation to give alkenes or alkynes.

Alkyl chlorides react with magnesium to give Grignard reagents, transforming an electrophilic compound into a nucleophilic compound. The Wurtz reaction reductively couples two alkyl halides to couple with sodium.

Some organochlorides (such as ethyl chloride) may be used as alkylating agents. Tetraethyllead was produced from ethyl chloride and a sodium–lead alloy:

4 NaPb + 4 CH_{3}CH_{2}Cl → Pb(CH_{3}CH_{2})_{4} + 4 NaCl + 3 Pb

Reductive dechlorination is rarely useful in chemical synthesis, but is a key step in the biodegradation of several organochlorine persistent pollutants.

== Applications ==
=== Vinyl chloride ===
The largest application of organochlorine chemistry is the production of vinyl chloride. The annual production in 1985 was around 13 million tons, almost all of which was converted into polyvinylchloride (PVC).

=== Chlorinated solvents ===
Most low molecular weight and liquid chlorinated hydrocarbons such as dichloromethane, chloroform, carbon tetrachloride, dichloroethylene, trichloroethylene, tetrachloroethylene, 1,2-Dichloroethane and hexachlorobutadiene are useful solvents. These solvents tend to be relatively non-polar; they are therefore immiscible with water and effective in cleaning applications such as degreasing and dry cleaning for their ability to dissolve oils and grease. They are mostly nonflammable or have very low flammability.

Some, like carbon tetrachloride and 1,1,1-Trichloroethane have been phased out due to their toxicity or negative environmental impact (ozone depletion by 1,1,1-Trichloroethane).

=== Chloromethanes ===
Several billion kilograms of chlorinated methanes are produced annually, mainly by chlorination of methane:

CH_{4} + x Cl_{2} → CH_{4−x}Cl_{x} + x HCl

The most important is dichloromethane, which is mainly used as a solvent. Chloromethane is a precursor to chlorosilanes and silicones. Historically significant (as an anaesthetic), but smaller in scale is chloroform, mainly a precursor to chlorodifluoromethane (CHClF_{2}) and tetrafluoroethene which is used in the manufacture of Teflon.

=== Pesticides ===
The two main groups of organochlorine insecticides are the DDT-type compounds and the chlorinated alicyclics. Their mechanism of action differs slightly.

- The DDT like compounds work on the peripheral nervous system. At the axon's sodium channel, they prevent gate closure after activation and membrane depolarization. Sodium ions leak through the nerve membrane and create a destabilizing negative "afterpotential" with hyperexcitability of the nerve. This leakage causes repeated discharges in the neuron either spontaneously or after a single stimulus.
- Chlorinated cyclodienes include aldrin, dieldrin, endrin, heptachlor, chlordane and endosulfan. A 2- to 8-hour exposure leads to depressed central nervous system (CNS) activity, followed by hyperexcitability, tremors, and then seizures. The mechanism of action is the insecticide binding at the GABA_{A} site in the GABA-gated chloride channel (IRAC group 2A), which inhibits chloride flow into the nerve.
- Other examples include dicofol, mirex, kepone, and pentachlorophenol. These can be either hydrophilic or hydrophobic, depending on their molecular structure.

Structure of mirex, a perchlorocarbon used as a pesticide

=== Insulators ===
Polychlorinated biphenyls (PCBs) were once commonly used electrical insulators and heat transfer agents. Their use has generally been phased out due to health concerns. PCBs were replaced by polybrominated diphenyl ethers (PBDEs), which bring similar toxicity and bioaccumulation concerns.

== Toxicity ==
Some types of organochlorides have significant toxicity to plants or animals, including humans. Dioxins, produced when organic matter is burned in the presence of chlorine, are persistent organic pollutants which pose dangers when they are released into the environment, as are some insecticides (such as DDT). For example, DDT, which was widely used to control insects in the mid-20th century, also accumulates in food chains, as do its metabolites DDE and DDD, and causes reproductive problems (e.g., eggshell thinning) in certain bird species. DDT also posed further issues to the environment as it is extremely mobile, traces even being found in Antarctica despite the chemical never being used there. Some organochlorine compounds, such as sulfur mustards, nitrogen mustards, and Lewisite, are even used as chemical weapons due to their toxicity.

However, the presence of a chlorine-carbon bond in an organic compound does not ensure toxicity. Some organochlorides are considered safe enough for consumption in foods and medicines. For example, peas and broad beans contain the natural chlorinated plant hormone 4-chloroindole-3-acetic acid (4-Cl-IAA); and the artificial sweetener sucralose (Splenda) is a common food additive. As of 2004, at least 165 organochlorides had been approved worldwide for use as pharmaceutical drugs, including the natural antibiotic vancomycin, the antihistamine loratadine (Claritin), the antidepressant sertraline (Zoloft), the anti-epileptic lamotrigine (Lamictal), and the inhalation anesthetic isoflurane.

== See also ==
- Organic halide
- Octachlorocyclobutane
