= 2,5-Dihydrofuran =

Chemical compound

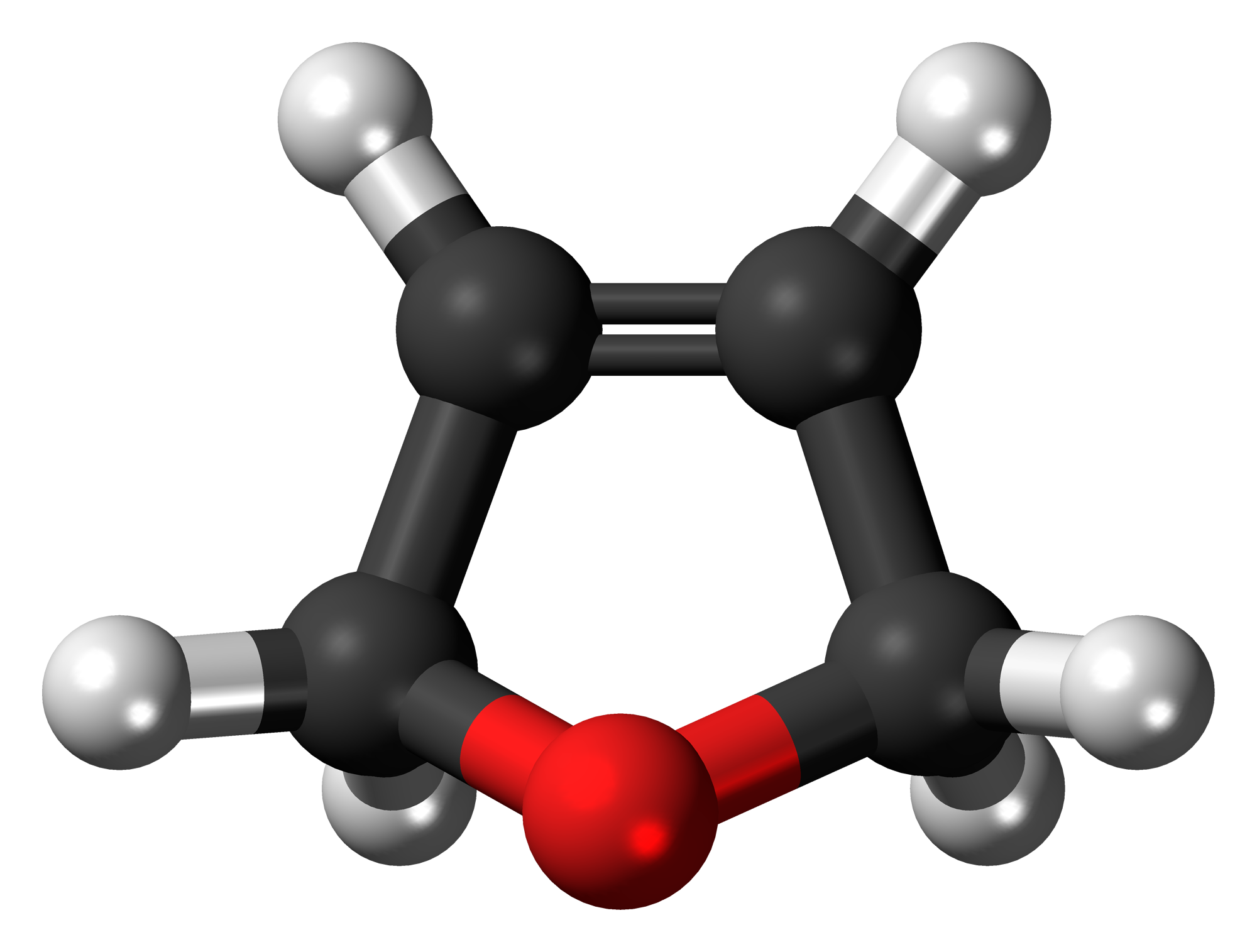

Names
- Preferred IUPAC name 2,5-Dihydrofuran

Identifiers
CAS Number	1708-29-8
3D model (JSmol)	Interactive image
ChEMBL	ChEMBL117135
ChemSpider	14813
ECHA InfoCard	100.015.416
PubChem CID	15570
UNII	HD0TIE091T
CompTox Dashboard (EPA)	DTXSID5051785
- InChI: InChI=1S/C4H6O/c1-2-4-5-3-1/h1-2H,3-4H2 Key: ARGCQEVBJHPOGB-UHFFFAOYSA-N; InChI=1/C4H6O/c1-2-4-5-3-1/h1-2H,3-4H2 Key: ARGCQEVBJHPOGB-UHFFFAOYAO
- SMILES: O1C/C=C\C1

Properties
Chemical formula	C_{4}H_{6}O
Molar mass	70.091 g·mol^{−1}
Density	0.9461 g cm^{−3}
Melting point	−86 °C (−123 °F; 187 K)
Boiling point	67.4 °C (153.3 °F; 340.5 K)
- Except where otherwise noted, data are given for materials in their standard state (at 25 °C [77 °F], 100 kPa). verify (what is ?) Infobox references

2,5-Dihydrofuran is an organic compound classified as a monounsaturated derivative of furan. It is a colorless, volatile liquid. It can be produced from the acid-catalyzed rearrangement 1‑butene 3,4‑epoxide.
