= 1778 =

1778 in various calendars
- Gregorian calendar: 1778; MDCCLXXVIII
- Ab urbe condita: 2531
- Armenian calendar: 1227; ԹՎ ՌՄԻԷ
- Assyrian calendar: 6528
- Balinese saka calendar: 1699–1700
- Bengali calendar: 1184–1185
- Berber calendar: 2728
- British Regnal year: 18 Geo. 3 – 19 Geo. 3
- Buddhist calendar: 2322
- Burmese calendar: 1140
- Byzantine calendar: 7286–7287
- Chinese calendar: 丁酉年 (Fire Rooster); 4475 or 4268 — to — 戊戌年 (Earth Dog); 4476 or 4269
- Coptic calendar: 1494–1495
- Discordian calendar: 2944
- Ethiopian calendar: 1770–1771
- Hebrew calendar: 5538–5539
- Hindu calendars
- Vikram Samvat: 1834–1835
- Shaka Samvat: 1699–1700
- Kali Yuga: 4878–4879
- Holocene calendar: 11778
- Igbo calendar: 778–779
- Iranian calendar: 1156–1157
- Islamic calendar: 1191–1192
- Japanese calendar: An'ei 7 (安永７年)
- Javanese calendar: 1703–1704
- Julian calendar: Gregorian minus 11 days
- Korean calendar: 4111
- Minguo calendar: 134 before ROC 民前134年
- Nanakshahi calendar: 310
- Thai solar calendar: 2320–2321
- Tibetan calendar: མེ་མོ་བྱ་ལོ་ (female Fire-Bird); 1904 or 1523 or 751 — to — ས་ཕོ་ཁྱི་ལོ་ (male Earth-Dog); 1905 or 1524 or 752

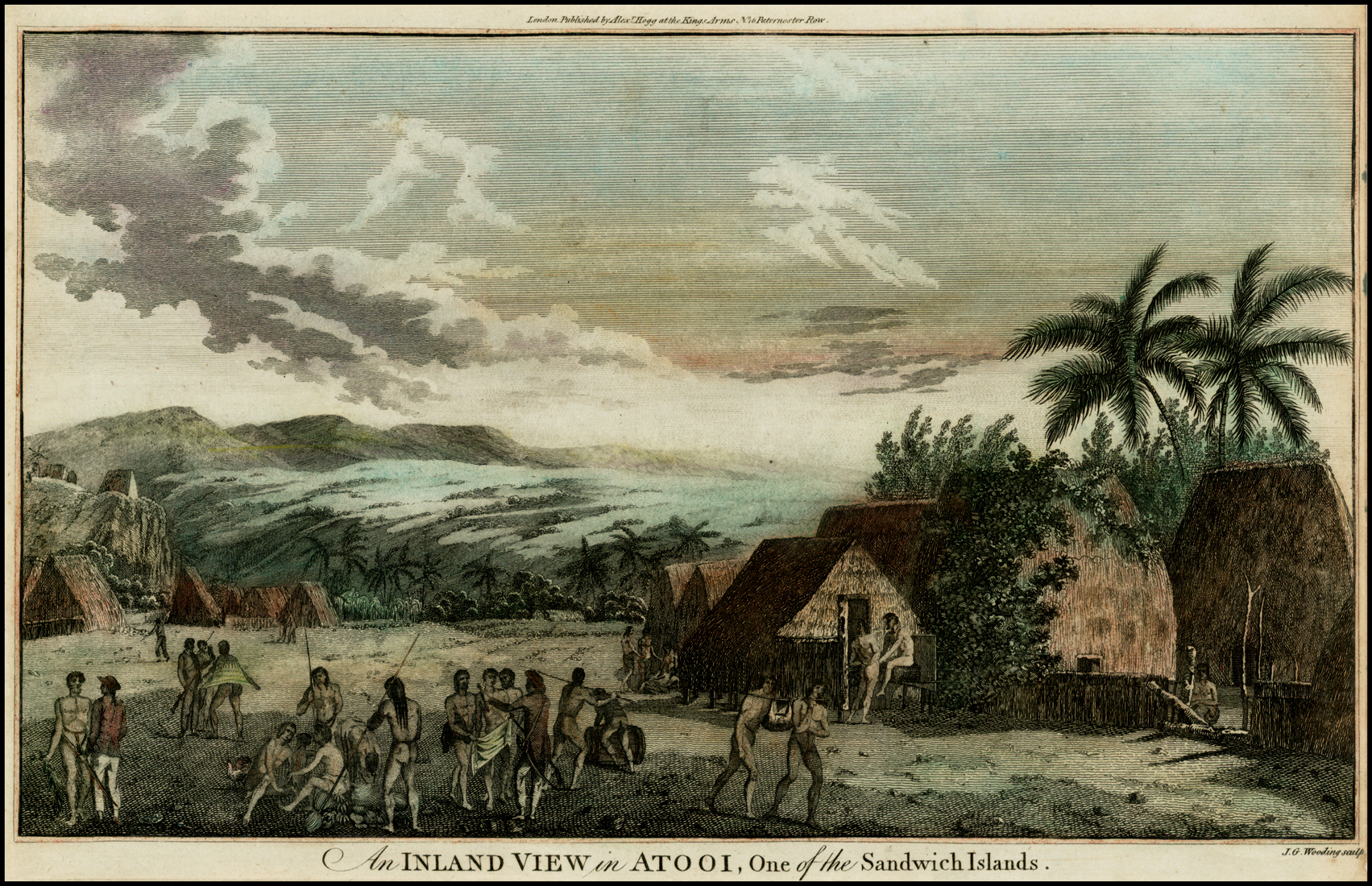
January 18: Britain's Captain Cook and crew become first Europeans to land on Hawaiian Islands

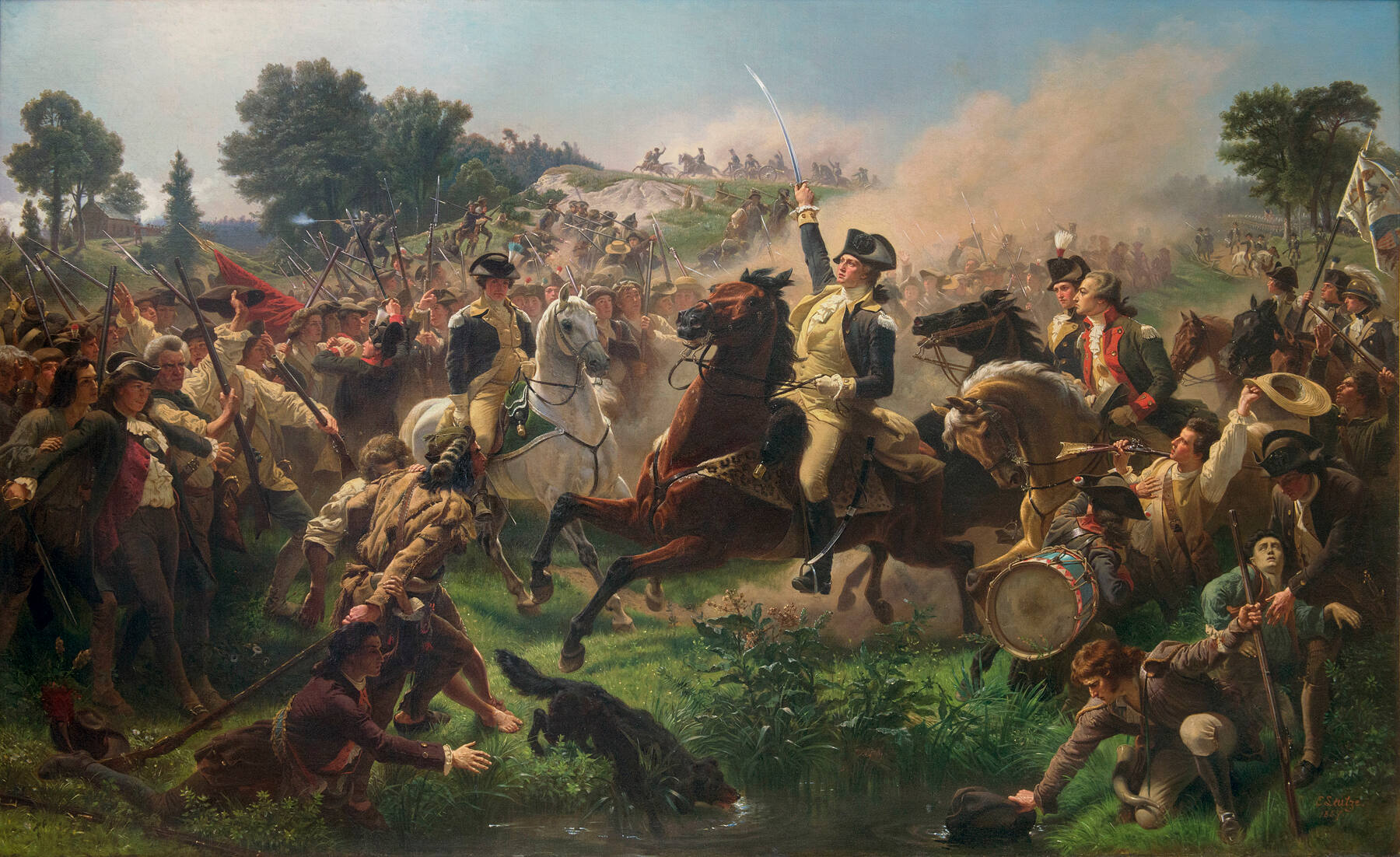
June 28: Battle of Monmouth

1778 (MDCCLXXVIII) was a common year starting on Thursday of the Gregorian calendar and a common year starting on Monday of the Julian calendar, the 1778th year of the Common Era (CE) and Anno Domini (AD) designations, the 778th year of the 2nd millennium, the 78th year of the 18th century, and the 9th year of the 1770s decade. As of the start of 1778, the Gregorian calendar was 11 days ahead of the Julian calendar, which remained in localized use until 1923.

== Events ==
=== January–March ===
- January 18 – Third voyage of James Cook: Captain James Cook, with ships HMS Resolution and HMS Discovery, first views Oʻahu then Kauaʻi in the Hawaiian Islands of the Pacific Ocean, which he names the Sandwich Islands.
- February 5 – In the United States:
  - South Carolina becomes the first state to ratify the Articles of Confederation.
  - General John Cadwalader shoots and seriously wounds Major General Thomas Conway in a duel after a dispute between the two officers over Conway's continued criticism of General George Washington's leadership of the Continental Army.
- February 6 – American Revolutionary War: In Paris, the Treaty of Alliance and the Treaty of Amity and Commerce are signed by the United States and France, signaling official French recognition of the new republic.
- February 23 – American Revolutionary War: Friedrich Wilhelm von Steuben arrives at Valley Forge, Pennsylvania and begins to train the American troops.
- March 6–October 24 – Captain Cook explores and maps the Pacific Northwest coast of North America, from Cape Foulweather (Oregon) to the Bering Strait.
- March 10 – American Revolutionary War: George Washington approves the dishonorable discharge of Lieutenant Frederick Gotthold Enslin, for "attempting to commit sodomy, with John Monhort a soldier".

=== April–June ===
- April 7 – Former British prime minister William Pitt delivers his last speech to Parliament, and speaks to the House of Lords "passionately but incoherently against the granting of independence" to the American colonies, but collapses during the debate, and dies five weeks later.
- April 12 – King George III appoints the five-member Carlisle Peace Commission to present peace terms to negotiate an end to the rebellion of Britain's 13 American colonies.
- April 30 – The 1,800 feet (550 m) long Hudson River Chain, designed to prevent British ships from moving up the river toward West Point, New York is stretched across the river and anchored by an engineering team under the direction of Captain Thomas Machin.
- May 12 – Heinrich XI, Prince Reuss of Greiz is elevated to Prince of the Principality of Reuss-Greiz by Joseph II, Holy Roman Emperor. This year sees the first appearance of the modern-day national colors of Germany on a flag that closely resembles the modern flag of Germany, to occur anywhere within modern-day Germany.
- May 30 – Benedict Arnold signs the U.S. Oath of Allegiance at Valley Forge.
- June 24 – A total solar eclipse takes place across parts of North America, from Texas to Virginia.
- June 28 – American Revolutionary War: Battle of Monmouth – George Washington's Continental Army battles British general Sir Henry Clinton's army to a draw, near Monmouth County, New Jersey.
- June – The Anglo-French War (1778–83) begins.

=== July–September ===
- July 3 – American Revolutionary War: The Battle of Wyoming takes place near Wilkes-Barre, Pennsylvania, ending in a terrible defeat for the local colonists.
- July 4 – American Revolutionary War: George Rogers Clark takes Kaskaskia.
- July 10 – Louis XVI of France declares war on the Kingdom of Great Britain.
- July 26 – In the Russian Empire, the forced emigration of Christians from the Crimea to Pryazovia begins.
- July 27 – American Revolutionary War: First Battle of Ushant – British and French fleets fight to a standoff.
- August 3 – The La Scala Opera House opens in Milan, with the première of Antonio Salieri's Europa riconosciuta.
- August 26 – Triglav, at 2,864 metres (9,396 ft) above sea level the highest peak of Slovenia, is ascended for the first time by four men: Luka Korošec, Matevž Kos, Štefan Rožič, and Lovrenc Willomitzer, on Sigmund Zois' initiative.
- August 29 – American Revolutionary War: The tactically inconclusive Battle of Rhode Island takes place, after which the Continental Army abandons its position on Aquidneck Island.
- September – The Massachusetts Banishment Act, providing punishment for Loyalists, is passed.
- September 7 – American Revolutionary War: Invasion of Dominica – The French capture the British fort there, before the latter is aware that France has entered the war in the Franco-American alliance.
- September 17 – The Treaty of Fort Pitt is signed, the first formal treaty between the United States and a Native American tribe (the Lenape or Delaware).
- September 19 – The Continental Congress passes the first budget of the United States.

=== October–December ===
- October 12 – The Continental Congress advises the 13 member states to suppress "theatrical entertainments, horse-racing, gaming, and such other diversions as are productive of idleness, dissipation, and general depravity of principles and manners."

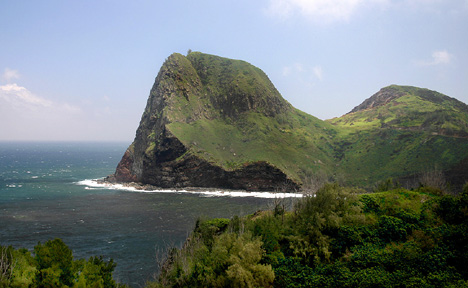
November 26: Captain Cook lands on Maui.

- November 11 – American Revolutionary War: Cherry Valley massacre – British forces and their Iroquois allies attack a fort and the village of Cherry Valley, New York, killing 14 soldiers and 30 civilians.
- November 26
  - In the Hawaiian Islands, Captain James Cook becomes the first European to land on Maui.
  - New Jersey becomes the second state to agree to the Articles of Confederation.
- December 10 – John Jay of New York is chosen as the sixth President of the Continental Congress.
- December 29 – American Revolutionary War: Capture of Savannah – British forces under Archibald Campbell take the city of Savannah, Georgia.

=== Undated ===
- The first settlement is made in the area of modern-day Louisville, Kentucky, by 13 families under Colonel George Rogers Clark.
- Phillips Academy is founded in Massachusetts by Samuel Phillips Jr.
- The term thoroughbred is first used in the United States, in an advertisement in a Kentucky gazette, to describe a New Jersey stallion called Pilgarlick.
- Thomas Kitchin's The Present State of the West-Indies: Containing an Accurate Description of What Parts Are Possessed by the Several Powers in Europe is published in London.
- The city of Ulaanbaatar is settled at its present location, having functioned as a mobile monastic settlement since 1639.

== Births ==
=== January–April ===
- January 1
  - Tredwell Scudder, American politician (d. 1834)
  - Charles Alexandre Lesueur, French naturalist (d. 1846)
- January 3 – Antoni Melchior Fijałkowski, Polish Catholic bishop (d. 1861)
- January 4
  - Billy J. Clark, American politician (d. 1866)
  - Paolo Polidori, Italian Catholic cardinal (d. 1847)
  - Jean-Antoine Alavoine, French architect (d. 1834)
- January 5 – Charles-Guillaume Étienne, French writer (d. 1845)

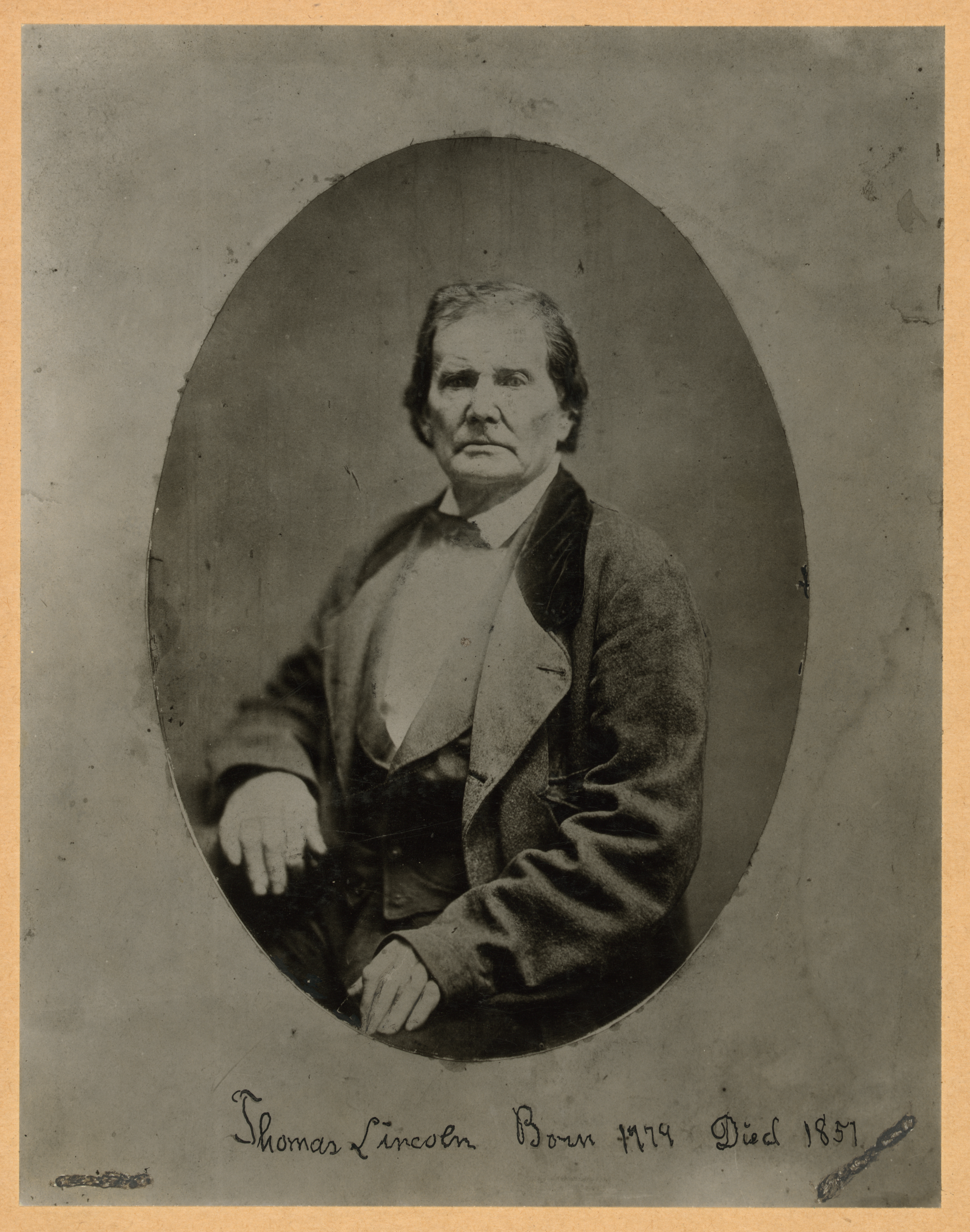
Thomas Lincoln

- January 6 – Thomas Lincoln, Farmer, Carpenter (d. 1851)
- January 7 – Anthony Todd Thomson, British dermatologist (d. 1849)
- January 9 – Thomas Brown, Scottish metaphysician (d. 1820)
- January 10 – Teodoro Sánchez de Bustamante, Argentine politician (d. 1851)
- January 11 – Agathon Jean François Fain, French historian (d. 1837)
- January 12 – William Herbert, British politician (d. 1847)
- January 13 – Sir Isaac Goldsmid, 1st Baronet, British financier and one of the leading figures in the Jewish emancipation in the United Kingdom (d. 1859)
- January 15 – Joseph Adamy, Nassauian politician (d. 1849)
- January 16
  - Teodoro Lechi, Italian general (d. 1866)
  - John Arbuthnott, 8th Viscount of Arbuthnott, Scottish peer and soldier (d. 1860)
- January 17
  - Donald Macdonell, Canadian politician (d. 1861)
  - George Black, Canadian politician, businessman and important shipbuilder in Quebec during the early decades of the 19th century (d. 1854)
- January 18 – George Bellas Greenough, British geologist (d. 1855)
- January 20 – Louis Antoine François Baillon, French naturalist, collector (d. 1855)
- January 21 – Jeremiah O'Brien, American politician (d. 1858)
- January 23 – Alire Raffeneau Delile, French botanist (d. 1850)
- January 24 – Charles Ferdinand, Duke of Berry, England (d. 1820)
- January 25 – Matsudaira Norihiro, Japanese daimyō who ruled the Nishio Domain (d. 1839)
- January 26
  - Jakob von Washington, Bavarian general (d. 1848)
  - Johann Georg Stauffer, Austrian luthier (d. 1853)
- January 27
  - Christian Mathias Schröder, German politician (d. 1860)
  - Andrew Sterett, United States Navy officer (d. 1807)
- January 28 – James Tallmadge, Jr., American politician (d. 1853)
- January 29 – John Williams, Tennessee politician (d. 1837)
- January 31 – Franz Anton von Kolowrat-Liebsteinsky, Austrian statesman (d. 1861)
- February 1 – Joseph Richardson, American politician (d. 1871)
- February 2 – Mary Anne Talbot, British wartime cross-dresser (d. 1808)
- February 3
  - Cornelis Vollenhoven, Dutch politician (d. 1849)
  - John Ritchie, British newspaper founder (d. 1870)
- February 4 – Augustin Pyramus de Candolle, Swiss botanist (d. 1841)
- February 5 – Jan Nepomucen Umiński, Polish general (d. 1851)
- February 6 – Ugo Foscolo, Italian writer, revolutionary and poet (d. 1827)
- February 13 – William P. Van Ness, United States federal judge (d. 1826)
- February 14 – Fernando Sor, Spanish musician (d. 1839)
- February 16
  - John Colborne, 1st Baron Seaton of Great Britain (d. 1863)
  - Rosalie Stier Calvert, 19th century Maryland plantation owner, correspondent (d. 1821)
- February 19
  - Friedrich Karl von Tettenborn, Russian military commander (d. 1845)
  - Henry Ashley, American politician (d. 1829)
  - Daniel Williams Harmon, American-born Canadian fur trader, diarist (d. 1843)
- February 22
  - Sir Roger Martin, 5th Baronet of Great Britain (d. 1854)
  - Rembrandt Peale, American painter (d. 1860)

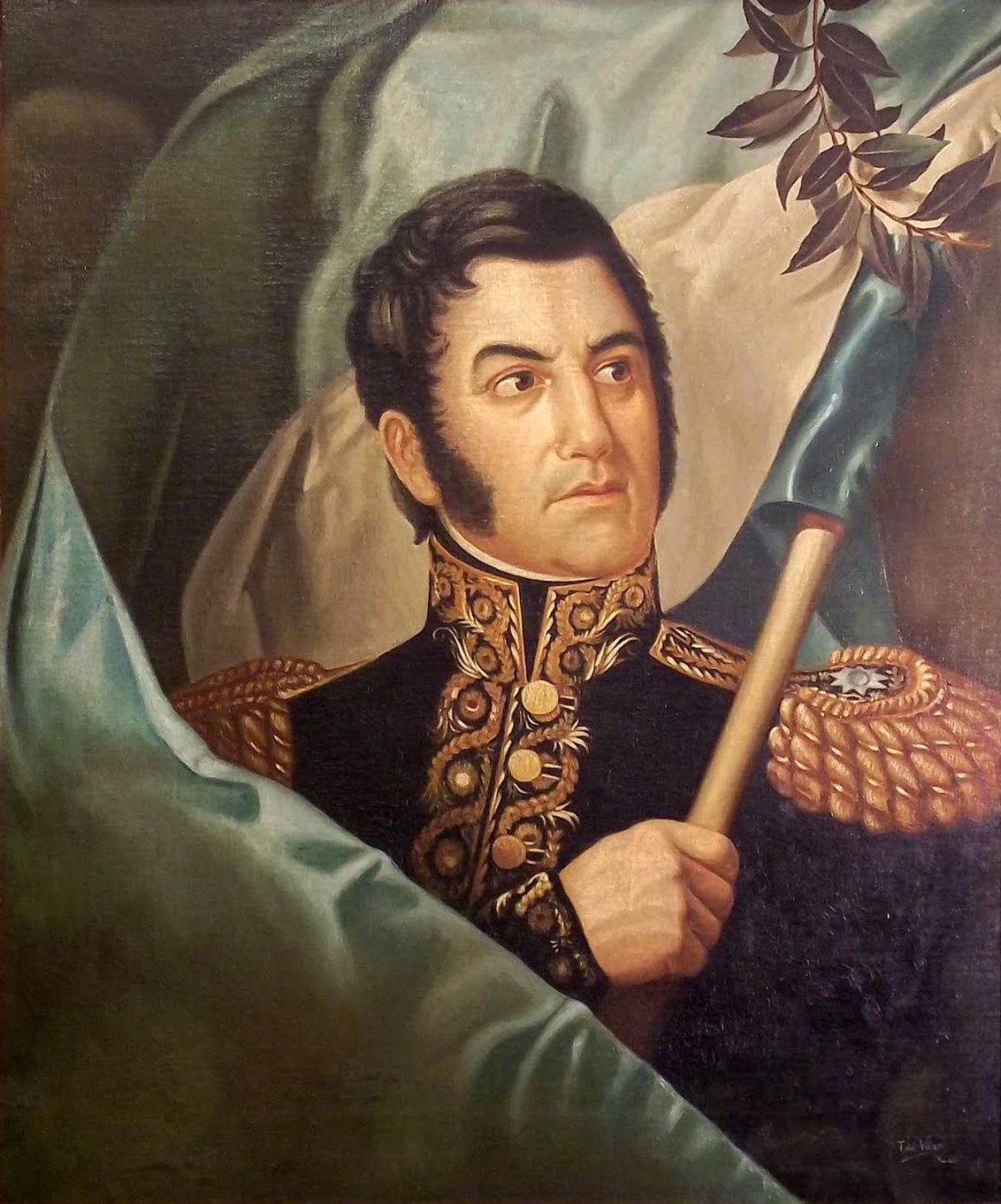
José de San Martín

- February 25 – José de San Martín, Argentine general (d. 1850)
- March 1
  - Chrétien Géofroy Nestler, French botanist (d. 1832)
  - Amos Lane, American politician (d. 1849)
- March 2
  - William Austin, American politician (d. 1841)
  - Vincent Moulac, French naval officer (d. 1836)
- March 3
  - Princess Frederica of Mecklenburg-Strelitz (d. 1841)
  - Peter Laurie, British politician (d. 1861)
- March 4
  - Sir Henry Bunbury, 7th Baronet, British Army general (d. 1860)
  - Robert Emmet, Irish rebel (d. 1803)
  - Florestano Pepe, Italian general (d. 1851)
- March 6
  - Francis Ogilvy-Grant, 6th Earl of Seafield, British politician (d. 1853)
  - Carl Bernhard von Trinius, German botanist (d. 1844)
- March 8 – Jean-Toussaint Arrighi de Casanova, French soldier, diplomat (d. 1853)
- March 10
  - Hugh Hornby Birley, leading Manchester Tory, reputed to have led the fatal charge of the Manchester and Salford Yeomanry, at the Peterloo Massacre (d. 1845)
  - Anthony Van Egmond, Canadian rebel (d. 1838)
- March 19 – Edward Pakenham, Irish-born British general (d. 1815)
- March 22
  - Thomas de Trafford, British Baronet (d. 1852)
  - Aleksey Merzlyakov, Russian poet, critic, and professor (d. 1830)
- March 23 – Paul Traugott Meissner, Austrian chemist (d. 1864)
- March 24
  - Robert Fleming Gourlay, British statistician and activist (d. 1863)
  - Anton Edler von Gapp, Austrian lawyer (d. 1862)
- March 25 – Sophie Blanchard, French aeronaut (d. 1819)
- March 26 – Edward Blakeney, British Army officer (d. 1868)
- March 28 – Ludvig Stoud Platou, Norwegian politician (d. 1833)
- March 30 – Robert Moore, American politician (d. 1831)
- March 31 – Coenraad Jacob Temminck, Dutch zoologist (d. 1858)
- April 1 – Benjamin Jacob, British musician (d. 1829)
- April 3 – Pierre Bretonneau, French physician (d. 1862)
- April 7 – John J. Ely, Member of the New Jersey General Assembly (d. 1852)
- April 9
  - John Sparks, English cricketer (d. 1854)
  - Louis de Beaupoil de Saint-Aulaire, French diplomat (d. 1854)

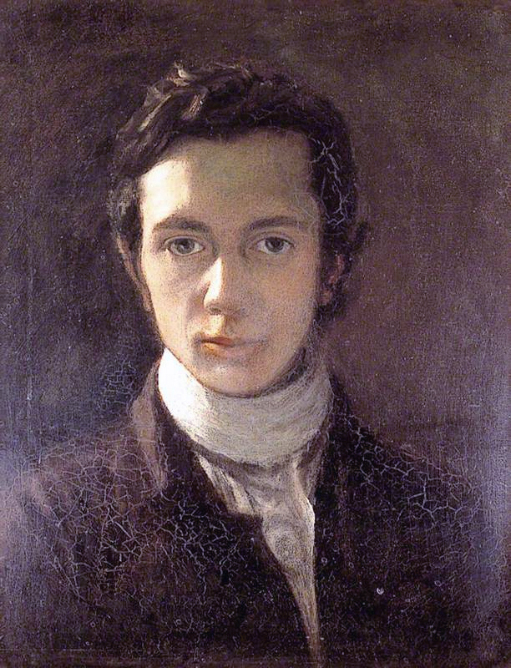
William Hazlitt

- April 10
  - Heinrich Luden, German historian (d. 1847)
  - William Hazlitt, English writer (d. 1830)
  - Johann Arzberger, Austrian technologist (d. 1835)
- April 12 – John Strachan, Bishop of Toronto (d. 1867)
- April 14 – George Philipp Ludolf von Beckedorff, prominent Prussian Catholic convert, parliamentarian (d. 1858)
- April 15
  - William Congreve Russell, British politician (d. 1850)
  - James Crooks, Canadian politician (d. 1860)
- April 18
  - Mary Bruce, Countess of Elgin, Scottish countess (d. 1855)
  - Christian Friedrich Nasse, German physician, psychiatrist (d. 1851)
  - Sir Matthew White Ridley, 3rd Baronet, British politician (d. 1836)
- April 19 – Elizabeth Wynne Fremantle, main author of the extensive Wynne Diaries, wife of Royal Navy officer Thomas Fremantle (1765–1819) (d. 1857)
- April 23 – John Harvey, British Army general (d. 1852)
- April 24 – John Graham, soldier notable for founding Grahamstown (d. 1821)
- April 27 – Henry Drury, English educator (d. 1841)
- April 28 – Adriaan van der Hoop, Dutch banker, politician (d. 1854)
- April 29 – Thomas Bateman, British physician, pioneer in the field of dermatology (d. 1821)
- April 30 – Arvid David Hummel, Swedish entomologist (d. 1836)

=== May–August ===
- May 2 – Nathan Bangs, American Methodist theologian (d. 1862)
- May 3 – Samuel Freeze, Canadian politician (d. 1844)
- May 6 – Henry Phillpotts, English bishop (d. 1869)
- May 8 – Marie-Louise Coidavid, Queen of the Kingdom of Haiti (1811–20) as the spouse of Henri I of Haiti (d. 1851)
- May 9 – Eli Ayers, Liberian politician (d. 1822)
- May 10 – William Ladd, American activist (d. 1841)
- May 12 – August Zeune, German educator (d. 1853)
- May 13 – Honoré V, Prince of Monaco (d. 1841)
- May 17 – Benjamin Bowring, English watchmaker (d. 1846)
- May 18
  - Andrew Ure, Scottish doctor and chemist (d. 1857)
  - Samuel Hoar, American politician (d. 1856)
  - Charles Vane, 3rd Marquess of Londonderry, British politician (d. 1854)
- May 19
  - Ruggero Settimo, Italian politician (d. 1863)
  - Ludwik Michał Pac, Polish general (d. 1835)
- May 25 – Claus Harms, German clergyman, theologian (d. 1855)
- May 29 – Charles Kemeys Kemeys Tynte, British politician (d. 1860)
- May 30 – Richard Skinner, American politician (d. 1833)
- May 31 – Horatio Seymour, American politician (d. 1857)
- June 2 – Jean Julien Angot des Rotours, French colonial governor (d. 1844)
- June 4 – Martin Parmer, American politician (d. 1850)
- June 6 – Edmund Varney, American politician (d. 1847)
- June 7 – David Willson, Canadian Quaker minister (d. 1866)
- June 11 – John Robison, British inventor (d. 1843)
- June 13 – Frederick Louis, Hereditary Grand Duke of Mecklenburg-Schwerin (d. 1819)
- June 14 – John Cushing Aylwin, United States naval officer (War of 1812) (d. 1813)

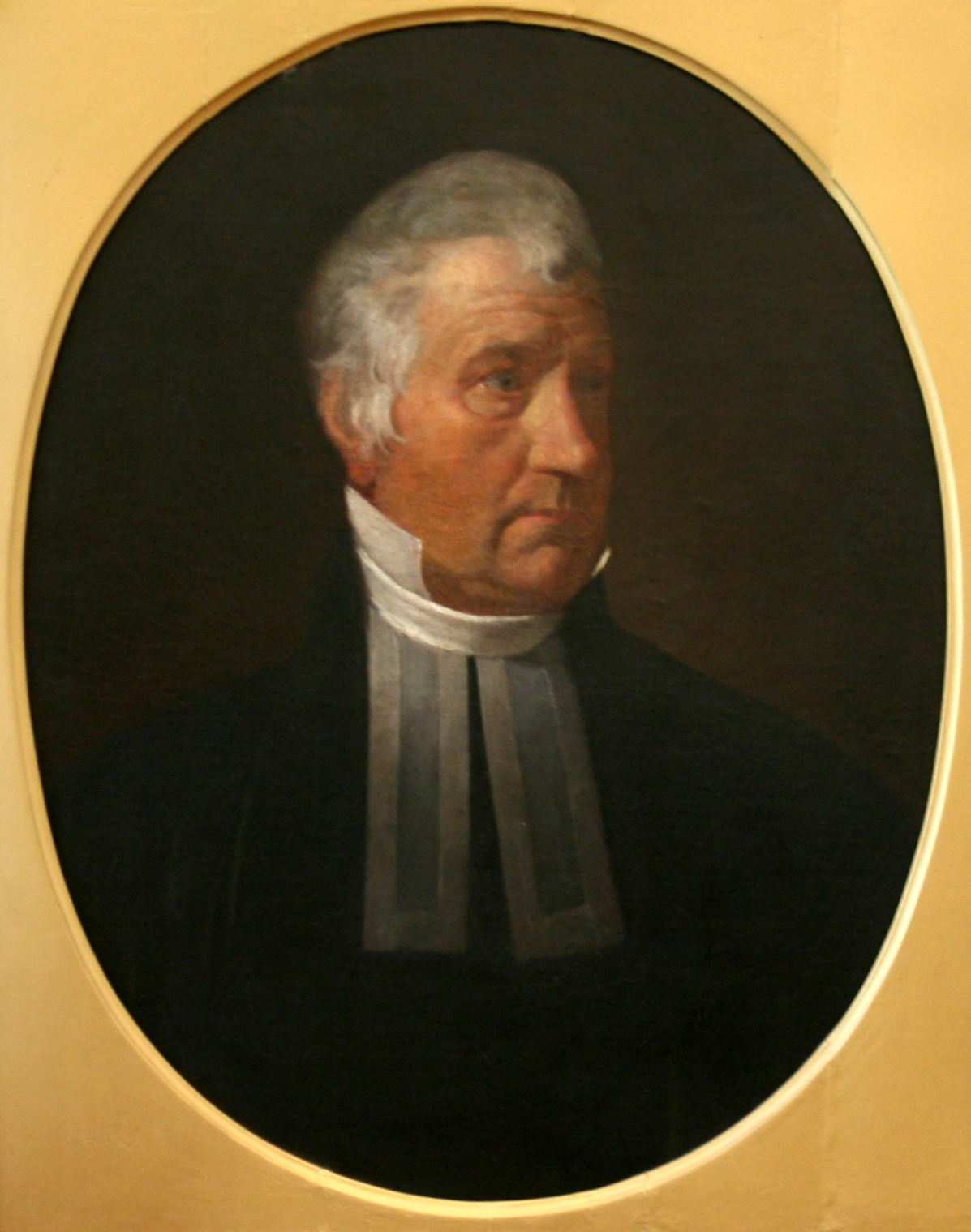
Harry Croswell

- June 16
  - Charles F. Mercer, American politician (d. 1858)
  - Harry Croswell, crusading American political journalist (d. 1858)
- June 17
  - Philip Willem van Heusde, Dutch philosopher (d. 1839)
  - Gregory Blaxland, English pioneer farmer, explorer in Australia (d. 1852)
- June 19 – Robert Allen, Tennessee politician (d. 1844)
- June 20 – Jean Baptiste Gay, vicomte de Martignac, moderate royalist French statesman, during the Bourbon Restoration (1814–30) under King Charles X (d. 1832)
- June 22 – George Percy, 5th Duke of Northumberland, British politician (d. 1867)
- June 23 – Richard W. Meade, American merchant and art collector (d. 1828)
- June 26 – Mariya Svistunova, lady-in-waiting at the Russian Court (d. 1866)
- June 27 – Sir John Astley, 1st Baronet, British politician (d. 1842)
- June 28
  - John Macbride, British historian (d. 1868)
  - William Dietz, American politician (d. 1848)
- July 2 – Daniel Wilson, Bishop of Calcutta (d. 1858)
- July 3 – Carl Ludvig Engel, German architect (d. 1840)
- July 6 – Jean Baptiste Bory de Saint-Vincent, French scientist (d. 1846)
- July 7 – Beau Brummell, English man of fashion (d. 1840)
- July 10
  - William Brockenbrough, American politician (d. 1838)
  - Laurent Cunin-Gridaine, French businessman, politician (d. 1859)
- July 11 – Timothy Fuller, American politician (d. 1835)
- July 12 – Maria Dalle Donne, Bolognese physician (d. 1842)
- July 13 – Samuel Stevens, Jr., American politician (d. 1860)
- July 15
  - Thomas James Maling, British Royal Navy officer (d. 1849)
  - Jasper Nicolls, British general (d. 1849)
- July 17 – Benjamin Isaacs, Connecticut politician (d. 1846)
- July 19
  - Thomas Foley, British politician (d. 1822)
  - Samuel Bent, American Mormon leader (d. 1846)
- July 20 – Joshua Tetley, British brewer (d. 1859)
- July 28 – Charles Stewart, American naval commander (d. 1869)
- July 30
  - David Pattee, Canadian politician (d. 1851)
  - Henry, Duke of Anhalt-Köthen (d. 1847)
- August 2 – Georg Anton Rollett, Austrian naturalist (d. 1842)
- August 5 – Otto Christian Blandow, German bryologist (d. 1810)
- August 8 – John Bonfoy Rooper, British landowner, MP (d. 1855)

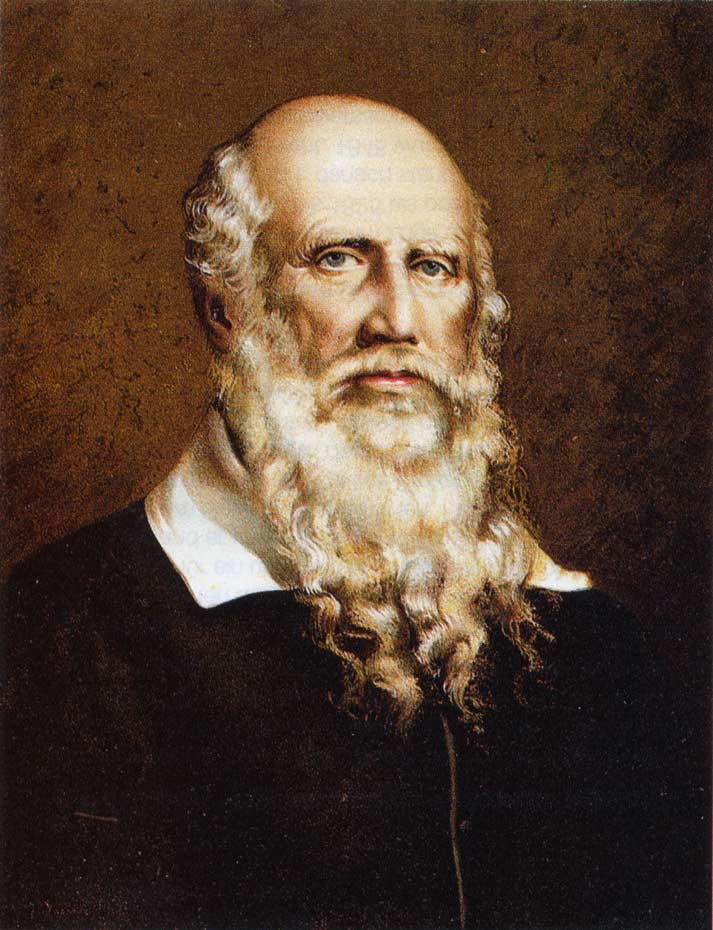
Friedrich Ludwig Jahn

- August 11
  - Marcus Pløen, Norwegian businessperson (d. 1836)
  - Charles Pierrepont, 2nd Earl Manvers, British naval officer and politician (d. 1860)
  - Friedrich Ludwig Jahn, German-Prussian gymnastics educator, nationalist (d. 1852)
- August 12
  - Francis Horner, British politician (d. 1817)
  - Joshua Vanneck, 2nd Baron Huntingfield, British politician (d. 1844)
- August 19
  - Princess Sophie of Saxe-Coburg-Saalfeld, German princess (d. 1835)
  - James Harris, 2nd Earl of Malmesbury, British politician (d. 1841)

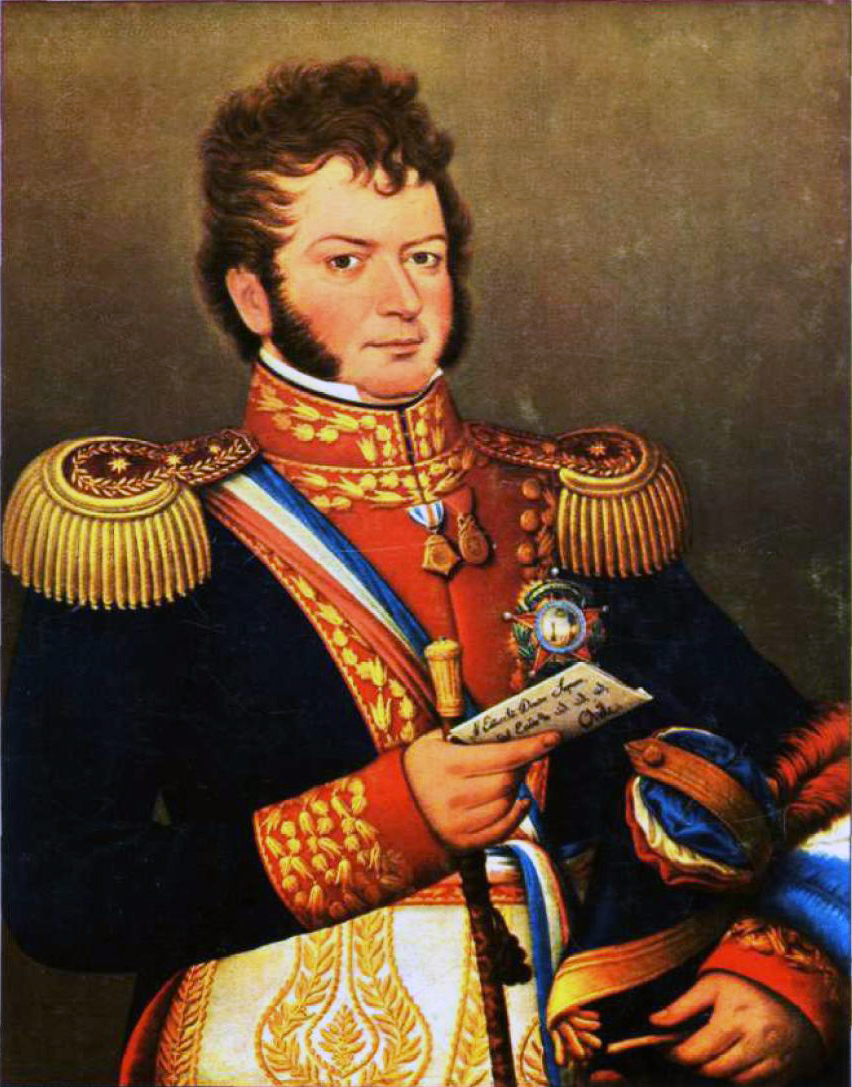
Bernardo O'Higgins

- August 20 – Bernardo O'Higgins, Supreme Director of Chile (d. 1842)
- August 21 – Lewis Weston Dillwyn, British politician (d. 1855)
- August 25 – Joseph Batten, British college principal (d. 1837)
- August 31 – William Wilkins, English architect (d. 1839)

=== September–December ===
- September 2 – Louis Bonaparte, brother of Napoleon Bonaparte, French army general, King of Holland (d. 1846)
- September 7 – José Bernardo Sánchez, Spanish missionary (d. 1833)
- September 8 – George Heneage Lawrence Dundas, British Royal Navy admiral (d. 1834)

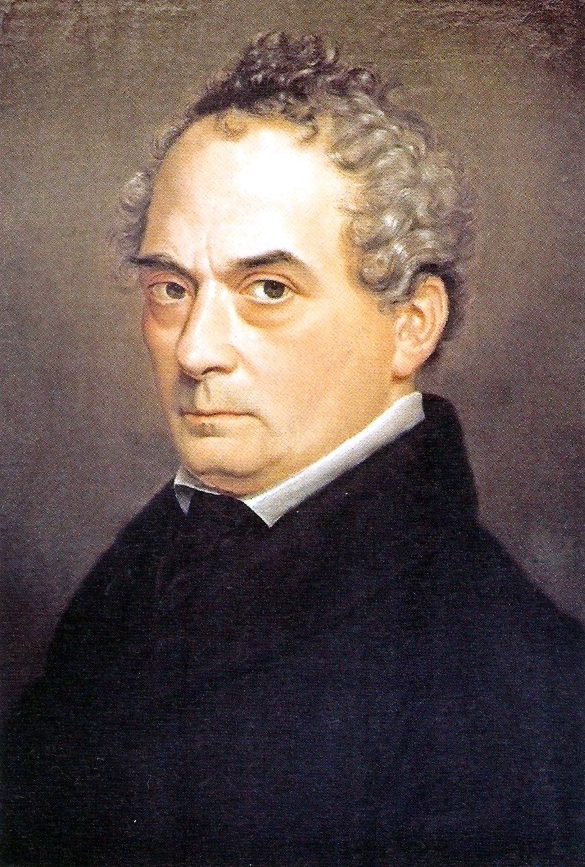
Clemens Brentano

- September 9 – Clemens Brentano, German poet, novelist (d. 1842)
- September 10 – Joshua Lawrence, American Baptist minister (d. 1843)
- September 12 – William Davidson, American politician (d. 1857)
- September 14
  - John Varnum, American politician (d. 1836)
  - John Barss, Canadian politician (d. 1851)
- September 15 – Augustin Caron, Canadian politician (d. 1862)
- September 19
  - Henry Brougham, 1st Baron Brougham and Vaux, British politician (d. 1868)
  - William Gaston, American politician (d. 1844)
- September 20
  - James Mann, 5th Earl Cornwallis of Great Britain (d. 1852)
  - Fabian Gottlieb von Bellingshausen, Russian admiral (d. 1852)
- September 21 – Carl Ludwig Koch, German entomologist (d. 1857)
- September 24 – Michał Gedeon Radziwiłł, Polish-Lithuanian noble (d. 1850)
- September 25
  - Sir Charles Oakeley, 2nd Baronet, 2nd Baronet in the Oakeley Baronets (d. 1829)
  - Prince Louis of Anhalt-Köthen, Duke of Anhalt-Köthen (d. 1802)
- September 26 – Jonathan Fisk, American politician (d. 1832)
- September 27
  - Carl Friedrich Rungenhagen, German composer, music teacher (d. 1851)
  - Damião Barbosa de Araújo, Brazilian composer (d. 1856)
- September 28
  - Luther Lawrence, American politician (d. 1839)
  - Suzanne Douvillier, French-born American ballerina, mime & choreographer (d. 1826)
  - Catherine McAuley, Irish nun, saint (d. 1841)
- September 29
  - Benjamin Hall, British politician (d. 1817)
  - Thomas Warsop, English cricketer (d. 1845)
- October 5
  - Ernst Ludwig von Aster, Prussian and Russian Army general (d. 1855)
  - Jacques Joseph Champollion-Figeac, French archaeologist (d. 1867)
- October 7
  - Charles Paget, British Royal Navy admiral (d. 1839)
  - Joseph Knight, English horticulturist (d. 1855)
  - Thomas Cranley Onslow, British politician (d. 1861)
- October 8 – Hyacinthe-Louis de Quélen, French Catholic bishop (d. 1839)
- October 9
  - Pierre-Denis, Comte de Peyronnet, President of the Bordeaux Court in France (1815) (d. 1854)
  - John FitzMaurice, Viscount Kirkwall, British politician (d. 1820)
  - Sir Lionel Smith, 1st Baronet, British Army general (d. 1842)
- October 13 – William Marks, American politician (d. 1858)
- October 14 – Francis Fane, British Royal Navy admiral (d. 1844)
- October 19 – Valentine Blacker, Irish-born Surveyor General of India (d. 1826)
- October 22 – Javier de Burgos, Spanish writer, politician and jurist (d. 1849)
- October 23 – Kittur Chennamma, Indian queen regnant (d. 1829)
- October 26 – Charles Grant, 1st Baron Glenelg, British politician (d. 1866)
- October 28 – Ezekiel Blomfield, British minister (d. 1818)
- October 29 – William Creighton, Jr., United States federal judge (d. 1851)
- October 30 – Benjamin Ames, American politician (d. 1835)
- October 31
  - Jacob Shibley, Canadian politician (d. 1862)
  - Charles Abraham Elton, English author (d. 1853)
  - John Black, Australian sailor (d. 1802)
- November 1
  - James R. Caldwell, United States Navy officer (d. 1804)
  - Gustav IV Adolf, King of Sweden (d. 1837)
- November 3 – Karlo Lanza, Dalmatian politician (d. 1834)

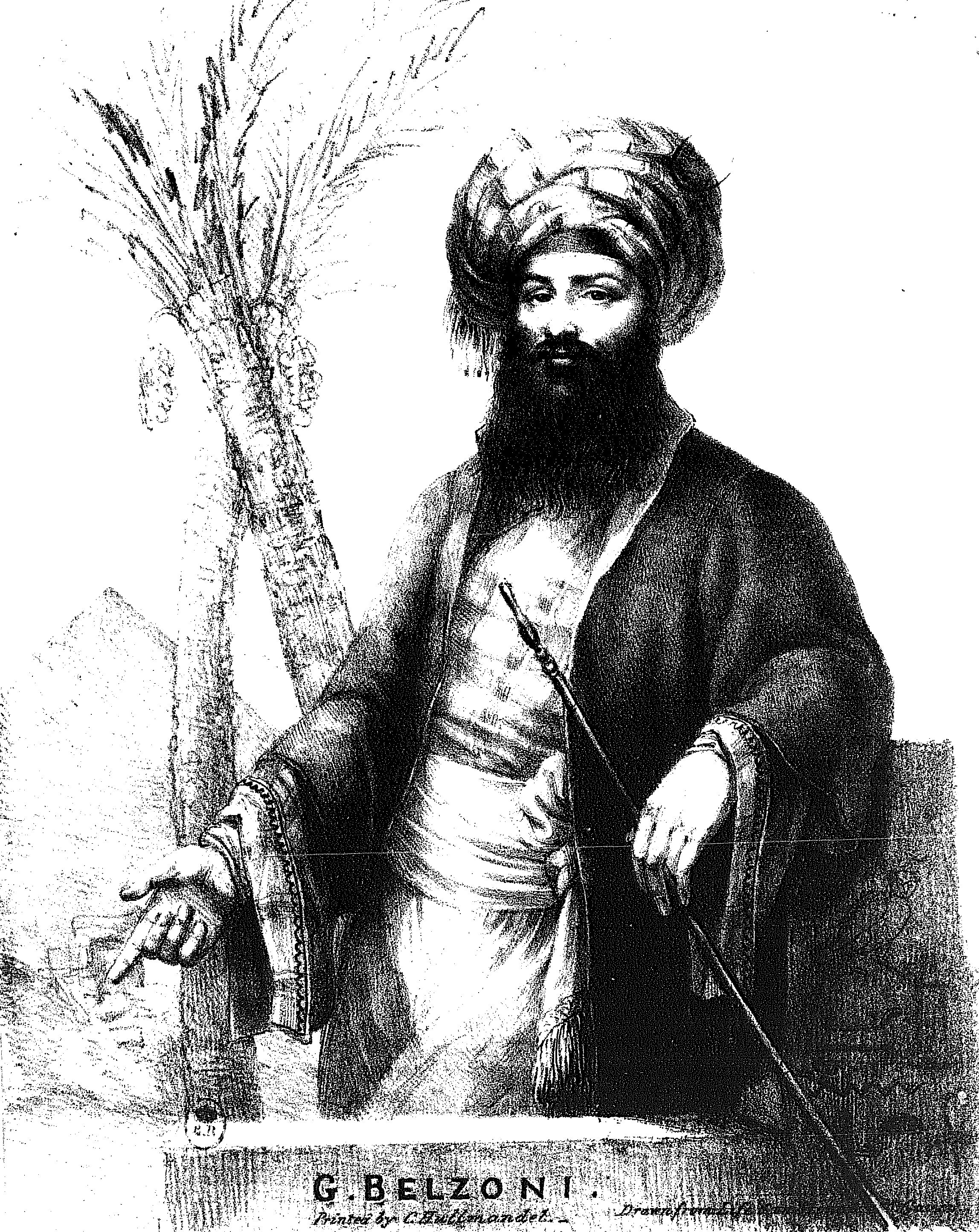
Giovanni Battista Belzoni

- November 5
  - Giovanni Battista Belzoni, Italian explorer (d. 1823)
  - Thomas Ritchie, American journalist (d. 1854)
- November 8 – Joseph Signay, Canadian Catholic bishop (d. 1850)
- November 11 – Nils Astrup, Norwegian politician (d. 1835)
- November 14
  - Heinrich Gottlieb Tzschirner, German theologian (d. 1828)
  - Johann Nepomuk Hummel, Austrian composer, virtuoso pianist (d. 1837)
- November 15
  - George Canning, 1st Baron Garvagh, British politician (d. 1840)
  - Giovanni Battista Belzoni, Italian antiquarian (d. 1823)
- November 16 – Johann Joseph von Prechtl, Austrian technologist (d. 1854)
- November 18 – Lord William Stuart, British politician (d. 1814)
- November 19 – Charles de Salaberry, Canadian politician (d. 1829)
- November 21
  - Richard Phillips, British chemist (d. 1851)
  - Thomas B. Cooke, American politician (d. 1853)
  - Joseph Warren Scott, American army officer (d. 1871)
  - Kunitomo Ikkansai, Japanese gunsmith (d. 1840)
- November 22 – Aurora Wilhelmina Koskull, Swedish lady-in-waiting, politically active salonist (d. 1852)
- November 23
  - Mariano Moreno, Argentine politician (d. 1811)
  - Samuel Humphreys, noted American naval architect and shipbuilder in the early 19th century (d. 1846)
- November 24 – Salusbury Pryce Humphreys, British Royal Navy officer during the French Revolutionary and Napoleonic Wars, and the War of 1812 (d. 1845)
- November 25
  - Joseph Lancaster, English Quaker, public education innovator (d. 1838)
  - Mary Anne Schimmelpenninck, British abolitionist (d. 1856)
- November 26
  - Jean-Thomas Taschereau, Canadian politician (d. 1832)
  - Henry Fane, British Army general (d. 1840)
- November 28
  - Filippo di Colloredo-Mels, leader of the Sovereign Military Order of Malta (d. 1864)
  - Abd al-Rahman of Morocco, Alaouite dynasty member (d. 1859)
- November 29 – Hryhorii Kvitka-Osnovianenko, Ukrainian writer, journalist, and playwright (d. 1843)
- November 30 – Andrés Guazurary, Argentine general (d. 1825)

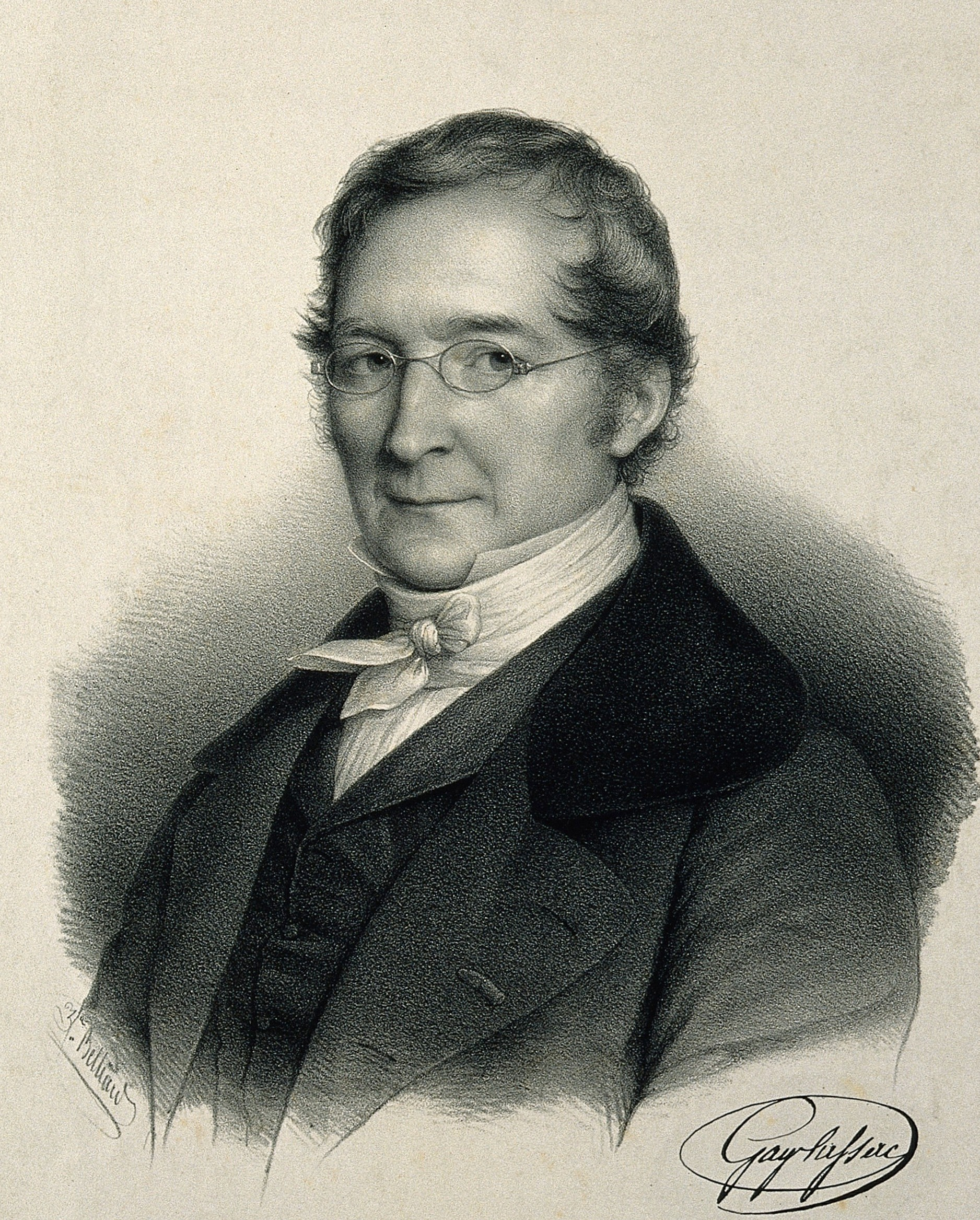
Joseph Louis Gay-Lussac

- December 6 – Joseph Louis Gay-Lussac, French chemist (d. 1850)
- December 7 – Franz Naegele, German obstetrician (d. 1851)
- December 9 – Vicente González Moreno, Spanish general (d. 1839)
- December 10 – Antonio Francesco Orioli, Italian Catholic cardinal (d. 1852)
- December 13
  - George Townshend, 3rd Marquess Townshend of Great Britain (d. 1855)
  - Thomas Kendall, New Zealand missionary (d. 1832)
- December 15
  - Godert van der Capellen, Dutch colonial governor (d. 1848)
  - Christiane Luise Amalie Becker, German actor (d. 1797)
- December 16
  - John Ordronaux, French privateer (d. 1841)
  - Ludwig Robert, German dramatist (d. 1832)
  - José Colombres, Argentine Catholic bishop (d. 1859)

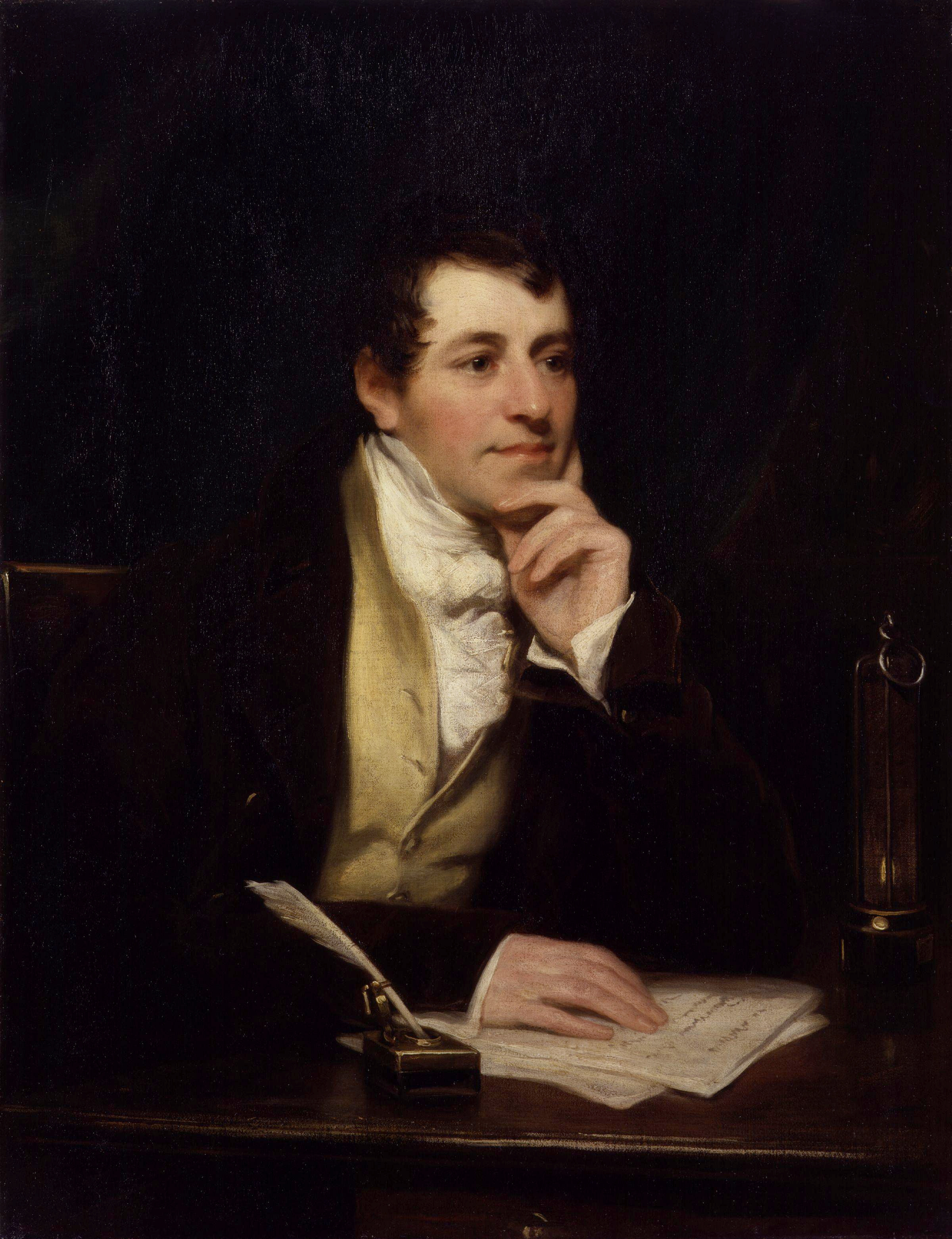
Humphry Davy

- December 17
  - Humphry Davy, English physicist, chemist (d. 1829)
  - William Munroe, American cabinet maker (d. 1861)
  - Juan Martín de Veramendi, Governor of Mexican Texas (d. 1833)

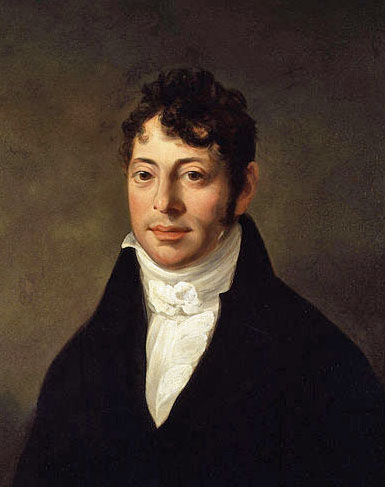
Joseph Grimaldi

- December 18 – Joseph Grimaldi, English actor and comedian (d. 1837)
- December 19 – Marie Thérèse of France, eldest child of Louis XVI and Marie Antoinette (d. 1851)
- December 20 – Thomas P. Grosvenor, American politician (d. 1817)
- December 21 – Anders Sandøe Ørsted, Danish politician (d. 1860)
- December 22 – James Haldane Stewart, British priest (d. 1854)
- December 23 – François de Robiano, Belgian politician (d. 1836)
- December 24
  - Inoue Masamoto, Japanese daimyō (d. 1858)
  - James Guyon, Jr., American politician (d. 1846)
  - Thomas Coventry, English cricketer (d. 1816)
- December 25 – Caleb Atwater, American politician (d. 1867)
- December 27 – Antoine François Eugène Merlin, French general (d. 1854)
- December 28
  - Franz Xaver Heller, German botanist (d. 1840)
  - William Cowper, English-born Anglican cleric in Australia, who was the Archdeacon of Cumberland (d. 1858)
  - Charles Hanbury-Tracy, 1st Baron Sudeley, British politician (d. 1858)
  - Matthew Arbuckle, United States soldier (d. 1851)
- December 29
  - Georg Anton Friedrich Ast, German philosopher (d. 1841)
  - Johann Simon Hermstedt, German musician (d. 1846)

=== Undated ===
- Sardar Fath 'Ali Khan, Wazir-i-azam of Kabul (d. 1818)
- Anna Maria Walker, Scottish botanist (d. 1852)
- Sara Oust, Norwegian lay minister (d. 1822)
- Marie-Madeleine Lachenais, Haitian de facto politician (d. 1843)

== Deaths ==
- January 3 – Paul Jacques Malouin, French chemist (b. 1701)

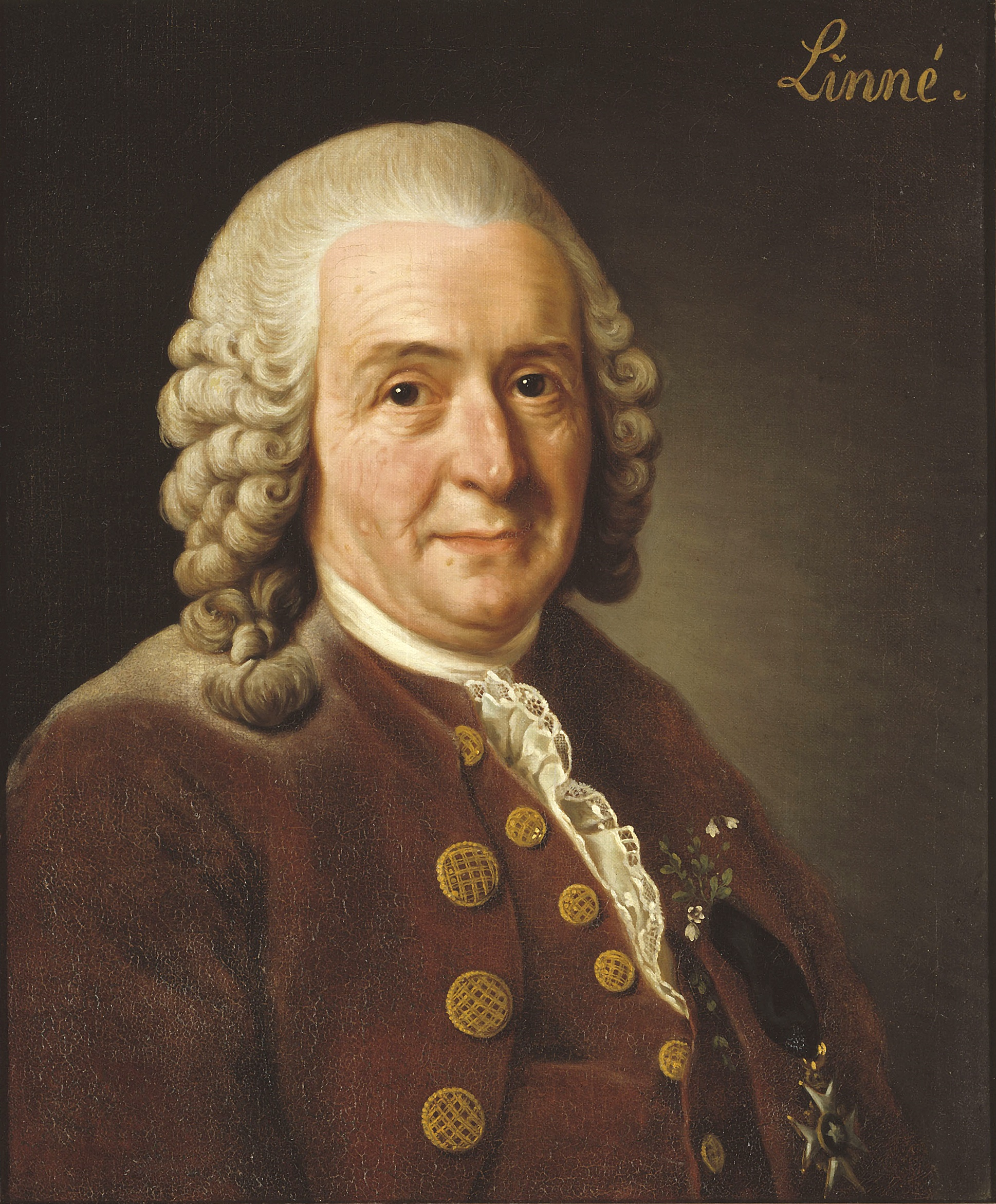
Carl Linnaeus

- January 10 – Carl Linnaeus, Swedish botanist (b. 1707)
- February 18 – Joseph Marie Terray, French statesman (b. 1715)
- February 20 – Laura Bassi, Italian physicist and academic (b. 1711)
- February 27 – Alexander Murray of Elibank, fourth son of Alexander Murray (b. 1712)
- March 5 – Thomas Arne, English composer of Rule, Britannia! (b. 1710)
- March 7 – Charles De Geer, Swedish industrialist and entomologist (b. 1720)
- March 13 – Charles le Beau, French historian (b. 1701)
- April 8 – Pieter Teyler van der Hulst, Dutch businessman (b. 1702)
- April 22 – James Hargreaves, English weaver, carpenter, and inventor (b. 1720)
- May 8 – Lorenz Christoph Mizler, German music historian, polymath (b. 1711)
- May 11 – William Pitt, 1st Earl of Chatham, Prime Minister of Great Britain (b. 1708)
- May 12 – Paul-Joseph Le Moyne de Longueuil, seigneur and colonial army officer in New France, governor of Trois-Rivières (b. 1701)
- May 16 – Robert Darcy, 4th Earl of Holderness, English diplomat and politician (b. 1718)

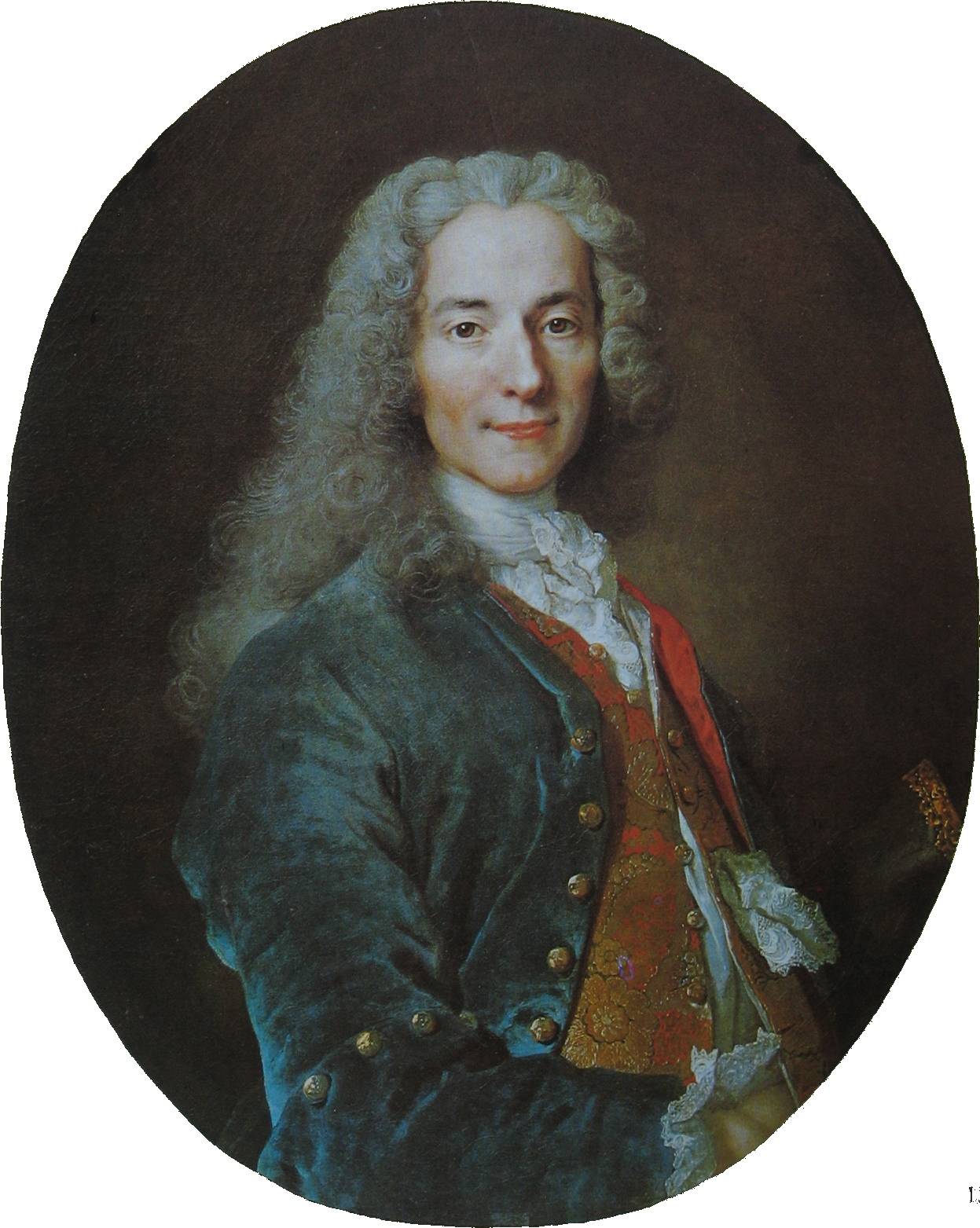
Voltaire

- May 30
  - José de la Borda, Spanish/Mexican mining magnate (b. c. 1699)
  - Voltaire, French philosopher (b. 1694)
- June 12 – Philip Livingston, American signer of the Declaration of Independence (b. 1716)
- June 16 – Konrad Ekhof, German actor (b. 1720)
- June 19 – Francesca Cuzzoni, Italian operatic soprano (b. 1696)
- June 24 – Pieter Burman the Younger, Dutch philologist (b. 1714)

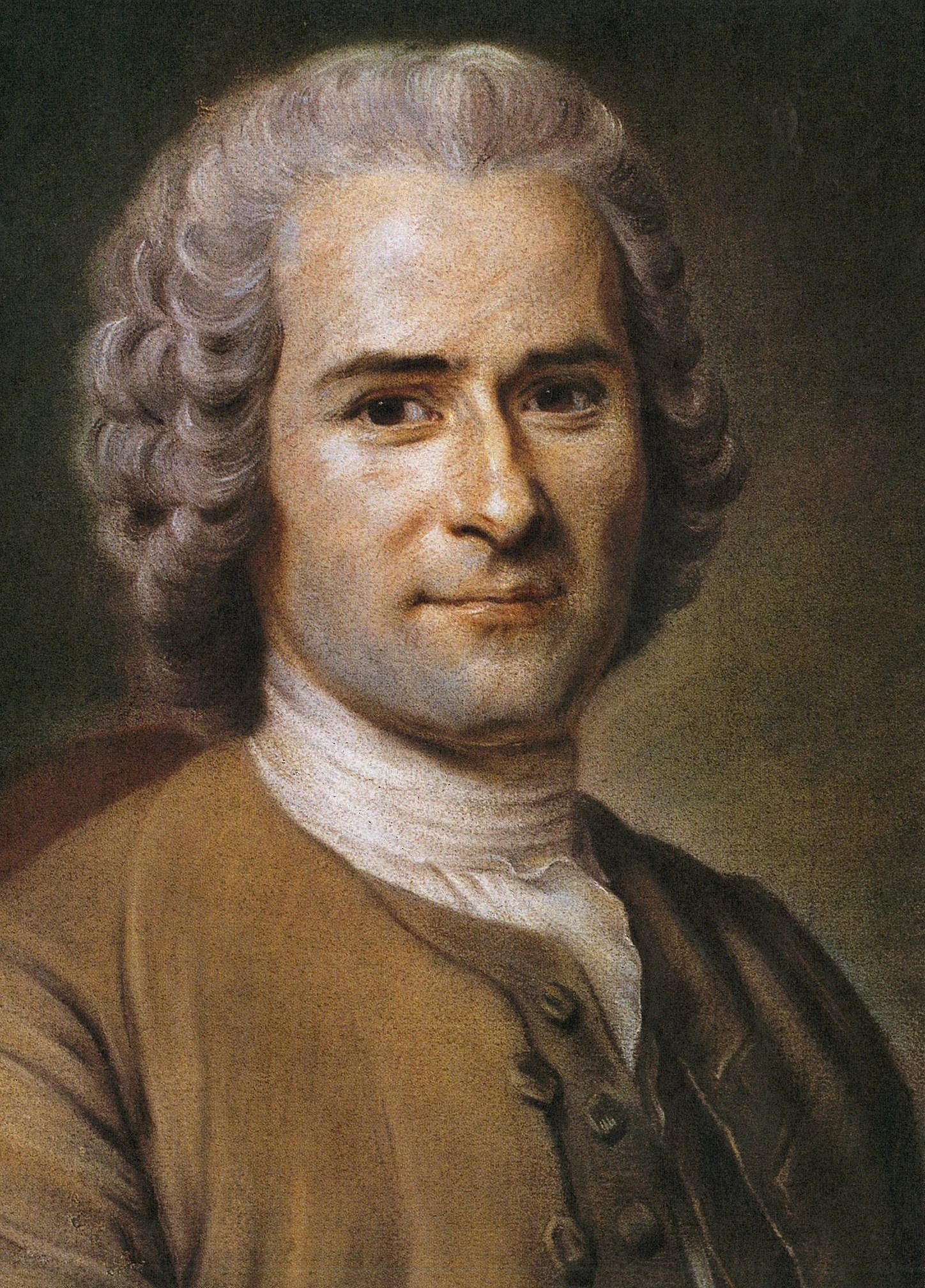
Jean-Jacques Rousseau

- July 3
  - Jean-Jacques Rousseau, Swiss philosopher (b. 1712)
  - Bathsheba Spooner, American murderer (b. c. 1746)
- July 3 – Anna Maria Mozart, Austrian mother to the Mozarts (b. 1720)
- July 4 – Ebenezer Kinnersley, American scientist (b. 1711)
- August 5 – Charles Clémencet, French historian (b. 1703)
- August 7 – Sir Thomas Cave, 5th Baronet of England (b. 1712)
- August 12 – Peregrine Bertie, 3rd Duke of Ancaster and Kesteven, British general, politician (b. 1714)
- August 26 – Johan Augustin Mannerheim, Swedish nobleman and military leader (b. 1706)
- October 1 – Washington Shirley, 5th Earl Ferrers, British Royal Navy admiral (b. 1722)
- October 6 – George Hay, British politician (b. 1715)
- October 11 – Saliha Sultan, daughter of Ottoman Sultan (b. 1715)
- October 24 – Henry Ernest of Stolberg-Wernigerode, German politician, provost and author (b. 1716)
- November 9
  - Giovanni Battista Piranesi, Italian artist (b. 1720)
  - Lydia Taft, American suffragist (b. 1712)
- November 11 – Anne Steele, English hymnwriter and essayist (b. 1717)
- November 20 – Francesco Cetti, Italian Jesuit scientist (b. 1726)
- December 26 – Pedro Antonio de Cevallos, Spanish military Governor of Buenos Aires (1757–1766) (b. 1715)
- December 30 – Constantine, Landgrave of Hesse-Rotenburg (b. 1716)
- date unknown – Thomas Johnson, English furniture maker (b. 1714)
