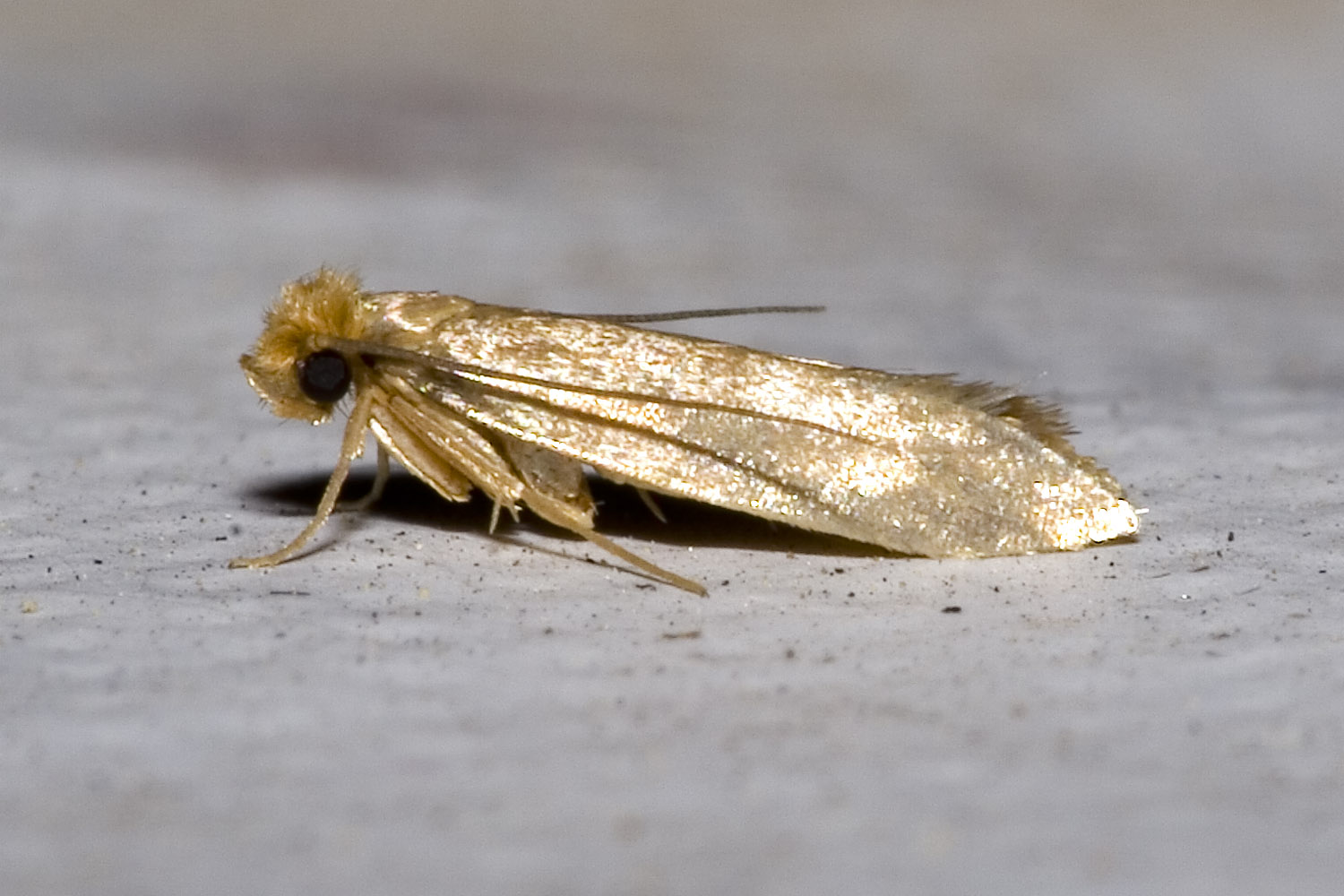

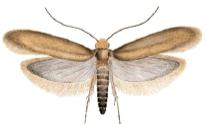

Scientific classification
- Kingdom: Animalia
- Phylum: Arthropoda
- Clade: Pancrustacea
- Class: Insecta
- Order: Lepidoptera
- Family: Tineidae
- Genus: Tineola
- Species: T. bisselliella

Binomial name
- Tineola bisselliella (Hummel, 1823)

Synonyms
- Numerous, see text

= Tineola bisselliella =

Species of moth

Tineola bisselliella, known as the common clothes moth, webbing clothes moth, or simply clothing moth, is a species of fungus moth (family Tineidae, subfamily Tineinae). It is the type species of its genus Tineola and was first described by the Swedish entomologist Arvid David Hummel in 1823. It and several closely related species are together known as the clothes moths due to their role as pests in human households. The specific name is commonly misspelled biselliella – for example, by G. A. W. Herrich-Schäffer, when he established Tineola in 1853.

The larvae (caterpillars) of this moth are considered a serious pest, as they can derive nourishment from clothing – in particular wool, but many other natural fibres – and also, like most related species, from stored foods, such as grains.

== Description ==
Tineola bisselliella is a small moth of 6–7 mm (0.24–0.28 in) body length and 9–16 mm (0.35–0.63 in) wingspan (most commonly 12–14 mm or 0.47–0.55 in). The head is light ferruginous ochreous, sometimes brownish-tinged.The antennae are thread-like and about four-fifths the length of the forewings. Forewings pale yellowish-ochreous; base of costa fuscous. Hindwings ochreous grey-whitish. (it is distinguished from similar species by its yellow-brown or ochreous colouring and red-orange tuft of hair on the head). The larva is white, eventually almost transparent, with a brown head. It lives in a silk tube.

== Life cycle ==
Females lay eggs in clusters of between 30 and 200, which adhere to surfaces with a gelatin-like glue. These hatch between four and ten days later into near-microscopic white caterpillars, which immediately begin to feed. They will also spin mats under which to feed without being readily noticed and from which they will partially emerge at night or under dark conditions to acquire food. Development to the next stage takes place through between five and 45 instars (developmental stages) typically over between one month and two years, until the pupal stage is reached. At this point, the caterpillars spin cocoons and spend another approximately 10–50 days developing into adults.

After pupation is complete, the adult moths emerge and begin searching for mates. Females tend to move less than males, and both sexes prefer scuttling over surfaces to flying— some adults never fly at all. Adults can live for an additional 15–30 days, after which they die (otherwise death takes place shortly after mating for males and shortly after egg laying for females). Life cycle may be completed within one month under the most favorable conditions (75 °F (24 °C) and 70–75% relative humidity) but may take several years (lower temperatures and humidity will only slow development, larvae will still hatch and grow at temperatures as low as 10 °C (50 °F) and can survive up to 33 °C (91 °F)).

Unlike the caterpillars, the adult moths do not feed: they acquire all of the nutrition and moisture they need while in the larval stage, and once they hatch from cocoons, their only goal is to reproduce. Adult mouth parts are atrophied and cannot be used on fabric or clothing. All feeding damage is done by the caterpillar (larval) form. The moths are seasonal in the wild, however heated buildings allow clothes moths to develop year-round. The overall life cycle from egg to egg typically takes 4–6 months, with two generations per year.

== Range and ecology ==
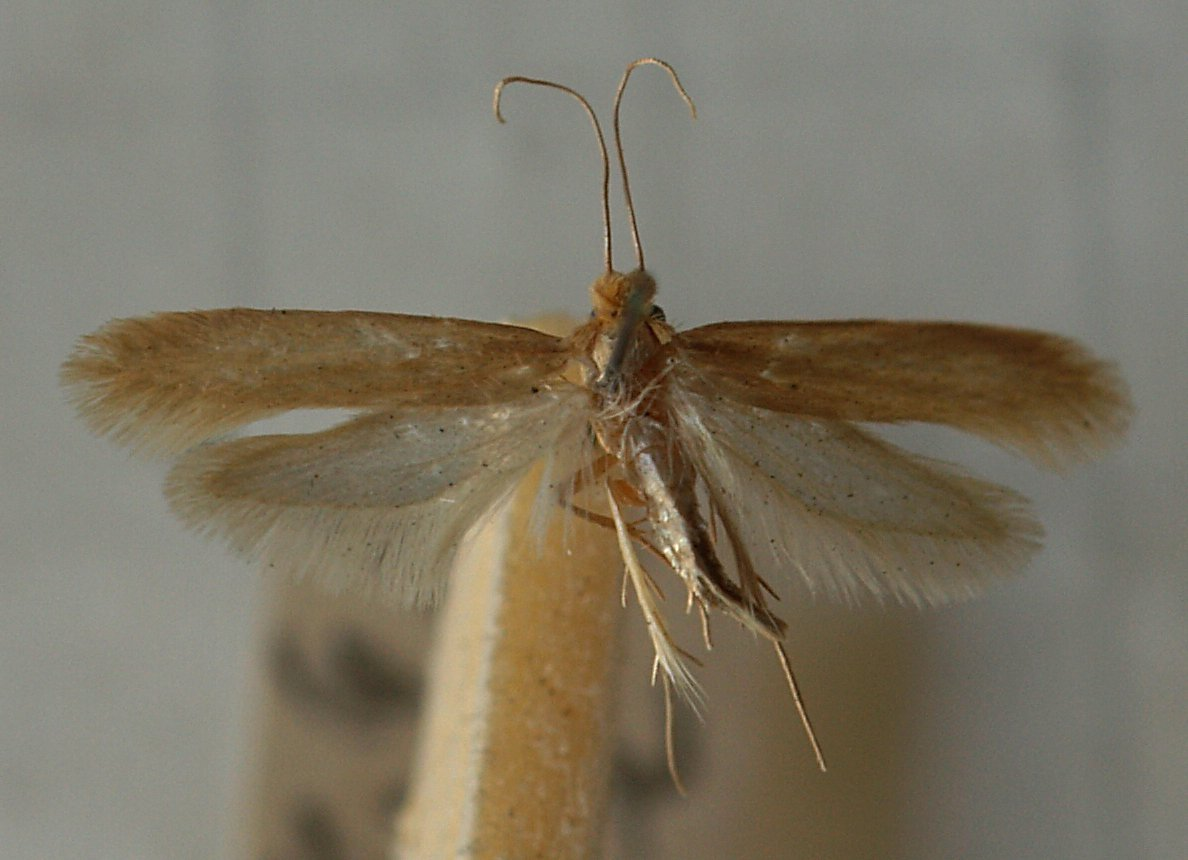
Mounted adult specimen with the wings spread out

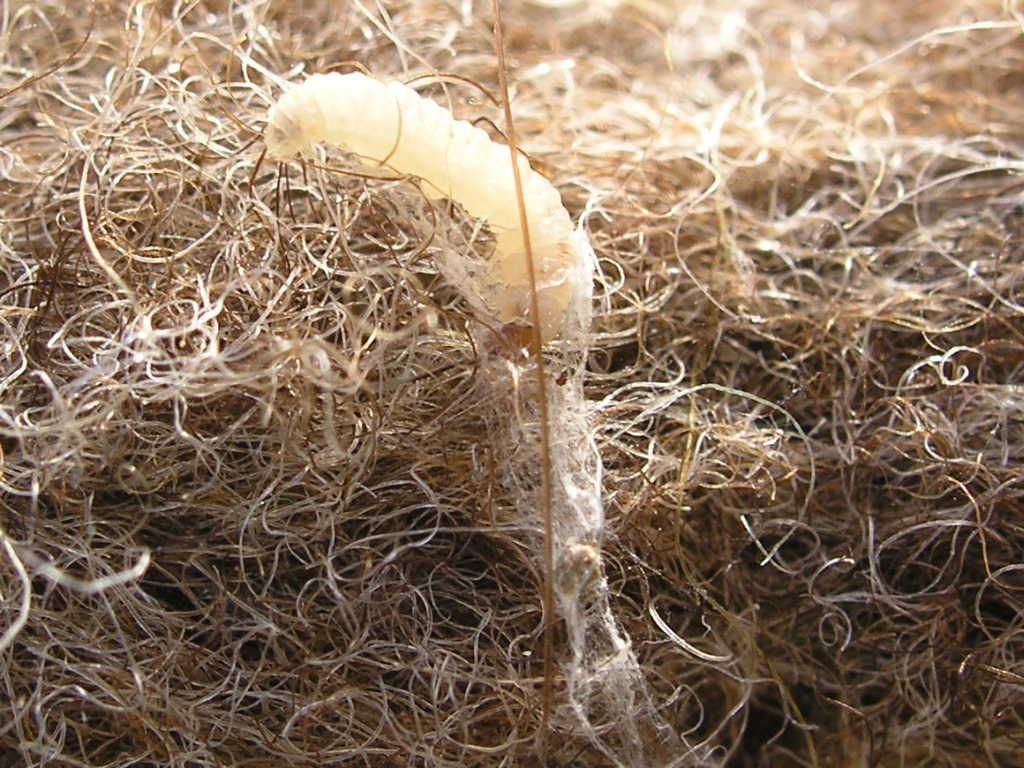
Larval form

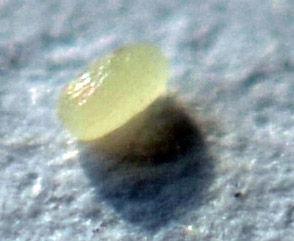
Macrophotography of a freshly laid, non-sticky egg measuring less than 1 mm

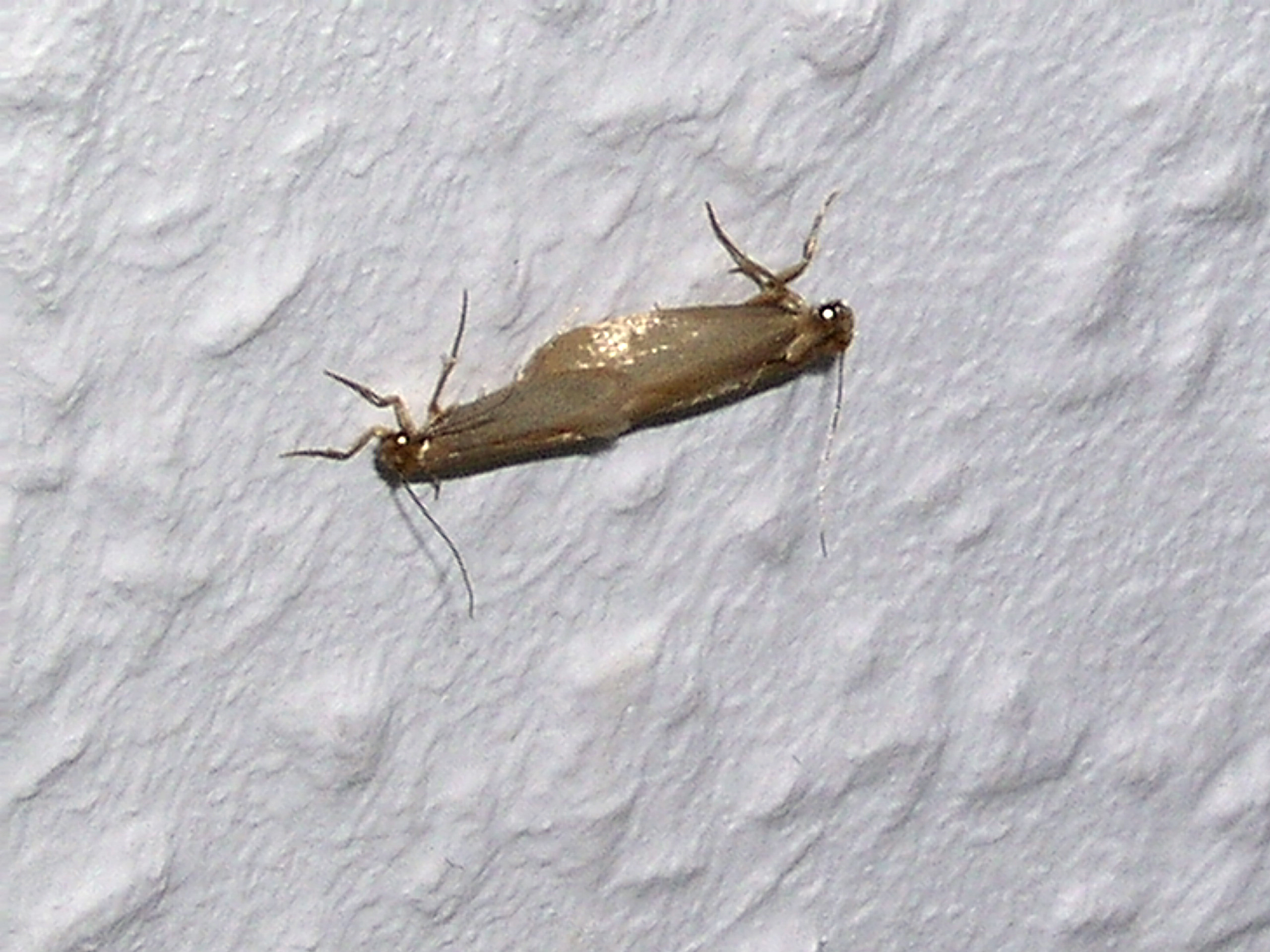
Two T. bisselliella mating

This moth's natural range is the western Palearctic (covering Europe, much of Asia, and North Africa), but it has been transported by human travellers to other localities. For example, it is nowadays found in Australia. The species' presence has not been recorded in France, Greece, Slovenia and Switzerland, though this probably reflects the lack of occurrence data rather than absence.

This species is notorious for feeding on clothing and natural fibres; they have the ability to digest keratin protein in wool and silk. The moths prefer dirty fabric for oviposition and are particularly attracted to carpeting and clothing that contains human sweat or other organic liquids which have been spilled onto them; traces of dirt may provide essential nutrients for larval development. Larvae are attracted to these areas not only for the food but for traces of moisture; they do not require liquid water.

The range of recorded foodstuffs includes linen, silk, and wool fabrics as well as furs. They will eat synthetic and cotton fibres if they are blended with wool and may use some cotton to build their cocoon. Furthermore, they have been found on shed feathers and hair, bran, semolina and flour (possibly preferring wheat flour), biscuits, casein, and insect specimens in museums. In one case, living T. bisselliella caterpillars were found in salt. They had probably accidentally wandered there, as even to such a polyphagous species as this one pure sodium chloride has no nutritional value and is in fact a strong desiccant, but this still attests to their robustness. Unfavourable temperature and humidity can slow development, but will not always stop it.

Both adults and larvae prefer low light conditions. Whereas many other Tineidae are drawn to light, common clothes moths seem to prefer dim or dark areas. If larvae find themselves in a well-lit room, they will try to relocate under furniture or carpet edges. Handmade rugs are a favourite, because it is easy for the larvae to crawl underneath and do their damage from below. They will also crawl under mouldings at the edges of rooms in search of darkened areas where fibrous debris has gathered and which consequently hold good food. Larvae can also sometimes act as bookworms, chewing through paper (which provides them no nutrition) to reach book bindings or mold colonies for nourishment.

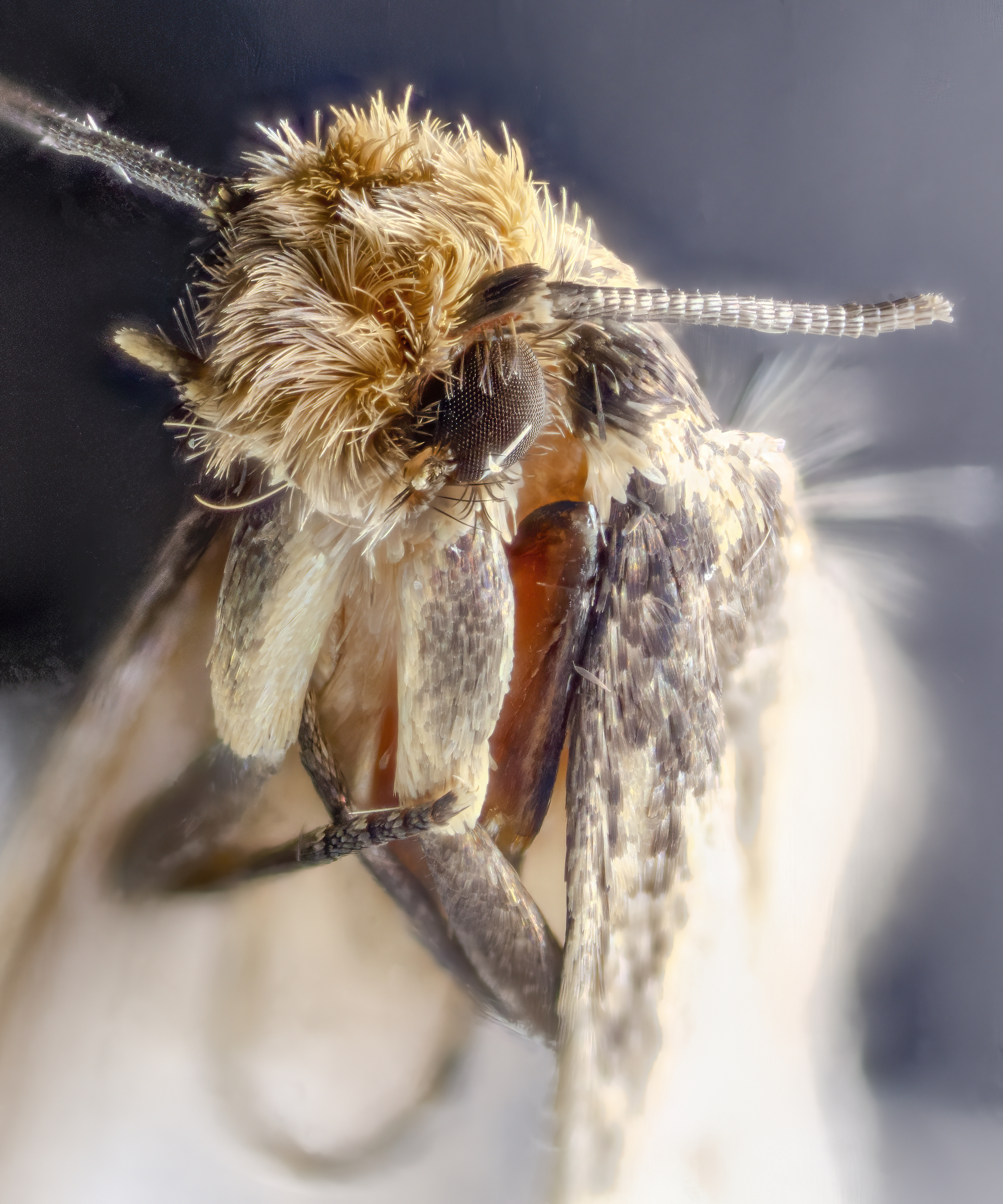
Close-up photo showing the compound eyes of T. bisselliella

== Pest control ==
Airtight containers should be used to prevent re-infestation once eggs, larvae, and moths are killed by any of the following methods. Control measures for T. bisselliella (and similar species) include the following:

- Anoxic measures work by displacing oxygen with an inert gas, asphyxiating the insects
  - Carbon dioxide anoxia – Similar to cryofumigation, but using compressed dry carbon dioxide gas to exclude oxygen Treatment for one week at 25 °C (77 °F) is recommended.
  - Nitrogen anoxia – Similar to cryofumigation, but using dry nitrogen gas to exclude oxygen. This process may cost more than carbon dioxide treatment.
  - Argon anoxia – Similar to cryofumigation, but using dry argon gas to exclude oxygen. This process may cost more than carbon dioxide treatment.
- Physical measures
  - Brushing vigorously in bright light can dislodge eggs and larvae, which may drop to the ground.
  - Clothing moth traps – Usually consisting of adhesive-lined cardboard enclosures baited with artificial pheromones, this measure can help monitor the current infestation and prevent males from mating with females. Only males are drawn to the traps.
  - Dry cleaning – This kills moths on existing clothing and helps remove moisture from clothes.
  - Freezing – Freezing the object for several days at temperatures below 18 °F (−8 °C) to kill larvae. However, eggs survive freezing to -23 °C.
  - Heat (120 °F or 49 °C for 30 minutes or more) – these conditions may possibly be achieved by placing infested materials in an attic or sun-baked automobile in hot weather, or by washing clothes at or above this temperature. Specialist pest controllers can also provide various methods of heat treatment.
  - Vacuuming – Since the moths like to hide in carpeting and baseboards (skirting), this is an important step towards full eradication. After thorough vacuuming, the bag should immediately be disposed of outside.
  - Burning – fire will destroy any live insects or larvae.
- Mothproofing chemicals – Treatment of materials as a preventive measure before their use, as well as simply for storage, has a long history. Arsenical compounds were effective in killing larvae but were considered too toxic for human contact even in the early twentieth century. Triphenyltin chloride was effective at 0.25%. After 1947, chlorinated hydrocarbon insecticides of many varieties were found to be effective at the low concentrations practical for preservative treatment. Examples are chlordane at 2% per weight of wool, toxaphene at 0.8%, pentachlorophenol or BHC at 0.5%, DDT at 0.2%, chlordecone and mirex at 0.06%, and dieldrin at 0.05%. Imidazole (a non-chlorinated aromatic heterocyclic) at 1% also gave satisfactory protection. A chemically related molecule, econazole nitrate, was found to exhibit strong anti-feeding properties against the common clothes moth. Besides solvent-based applications, insecticidal dusts were commonly used to treat fabrics. In the 1950s EQ-53, a DDT emulsion, was recommended by the US Department of Agriculture to add to the final rinse of washable woollens, but even then cautions were given to the use of chlorinated hydrocarbons on items subject to commercial drycleaning. The 1985 United States EPA ban on most uses of Aldrin and Dieldrin exempted moth-proofing in a closed manufacturing process. Triazole, thiazole, and imidazole derivatives have an anti-feeding effect on Tineola bisselliella larvae when wool is treated with these compounds. At 3% of mass of wool, both epoxiconazole and econazole nitrate protect wool fabric from Tineola bisselliella to the standard specified by Wools of New Zealand Test Method 25 (based on ISO 3998-1977(E).
- Mothballs – Used primarily as a preservative but also will kill existing larvae if the concentration is high enough. There are two types of mothball: early twentieth century ones were often based on naphthalene, while mid twentieth century ones often used paradichlorobenzene. Both chemical crystals sublimate into a gas, which is heavier than air and needs to reach a high concentration around the protected material to be effective. Disadvantages: Vapours are toxic and carcinogenic; mothballs are poisonous and should not be put where they can be eaten by children or pets. Naphthalene mothballs are also highly flammable.
- Insecticides – Typically aerosol application works best if coverage is adequate. Treat once a month for the first three months and then once a quarter for the next year to ensure the infestation is under control.
  - Permethrin – A particular synthetic pyrethroid available as aerosol spray. Disadvantages: very toxic to cats and fish. As Tineola bisselliella is the major worldwide pest for woollen products, permethrin-based agents have been commercialised for the protection of wool from this and other keratinophagous species.
  - Pyrethroids or pyrethrins (e.g. Cy-Kick, Deltamethrin, and d-Phenothrin which is used in 'Raid' fly spray ) – Synthetic or natural pyrethrins available as aerosol spray or as dusts. Disadvantages: some are persistent in the ecosystem and toxic to fish, possibly resistance.
  - Pyriproxyfen (or other juvenile hormone analogs) – Stops the life cycle by preventing the caterpillars from pupating.
  - Bifenthrin - A synthetic pyrethroid commercialised as an alternative to permethrin, for the protection of woollen products from Tineola bisselliella and other species.
  - Chlorfenapyr - A halogenated pyrrole insecticide commercialised as an alternative to synthetic pyrethroid insecticides in the protection of woollen products from Tineola bisselliella and other species.
- Biological measures
  - Camphor – Possibly safer alternative to mothballs.
  - Eastern red cedar – Questionable value as long-term deterrent. While the volatile oil is able to kill small larvae, it is difficult to maintain sufficient concentrations of it around stored articles to be effective; cedar wood loses all moth-suppressant capabilities after a few years. Distilled red cedar oil is commercially available to renew dried-out cedar wood. Airtight construction is more important than the type of wood used to make a container.
  - Lavender – Either bags with dried lavender flowers are put into the wardrobe (they can be refreshed by putting a few drops of lavender oil on them), or a few drops of lavender oil are put on a piece of fabric which is then deposited in the wardrobe and periodically refreshed. Disadvantage: strong "perfumed" smell.
  - Trichogrammatid wasps (e.g. Trichogramma evanescens) – Tiny parasitoid wasps which place their own eggs inside those of the moths; their larvae eat the moth eggs. Trichogrammatid wasps are harmless to humans, measuring only about 2 millimetres (0.079 in). Once moth eggs are eaten, the wasps vanish within 2–4 weeks.

== Synonyms ==
The common clothes moth is such a widespread and frequently seen species that it has been described time and again under a variety of junior synonyms and other now-invalid scientific names:

- Tinea biselliella Staudinger, 1899 (lapsus)
- Tinea bisselliella Hummel, 1823
- Tinea crinella Sodoffsky, 1830
- Tinea destructor Stephens, 1825
- Tinea flavifrontella Thunberg, 1794 (non Denis & Schiffermüller, 1775: preoccupied)
- Tinea lanariella Clemens, 1859
- Tinea vestianella (sensu auct., non Linnaeus, 1758: preoccupied)
- Tineola furciferella Zaguljaev, 1954
