= Lambach =

- Municipality
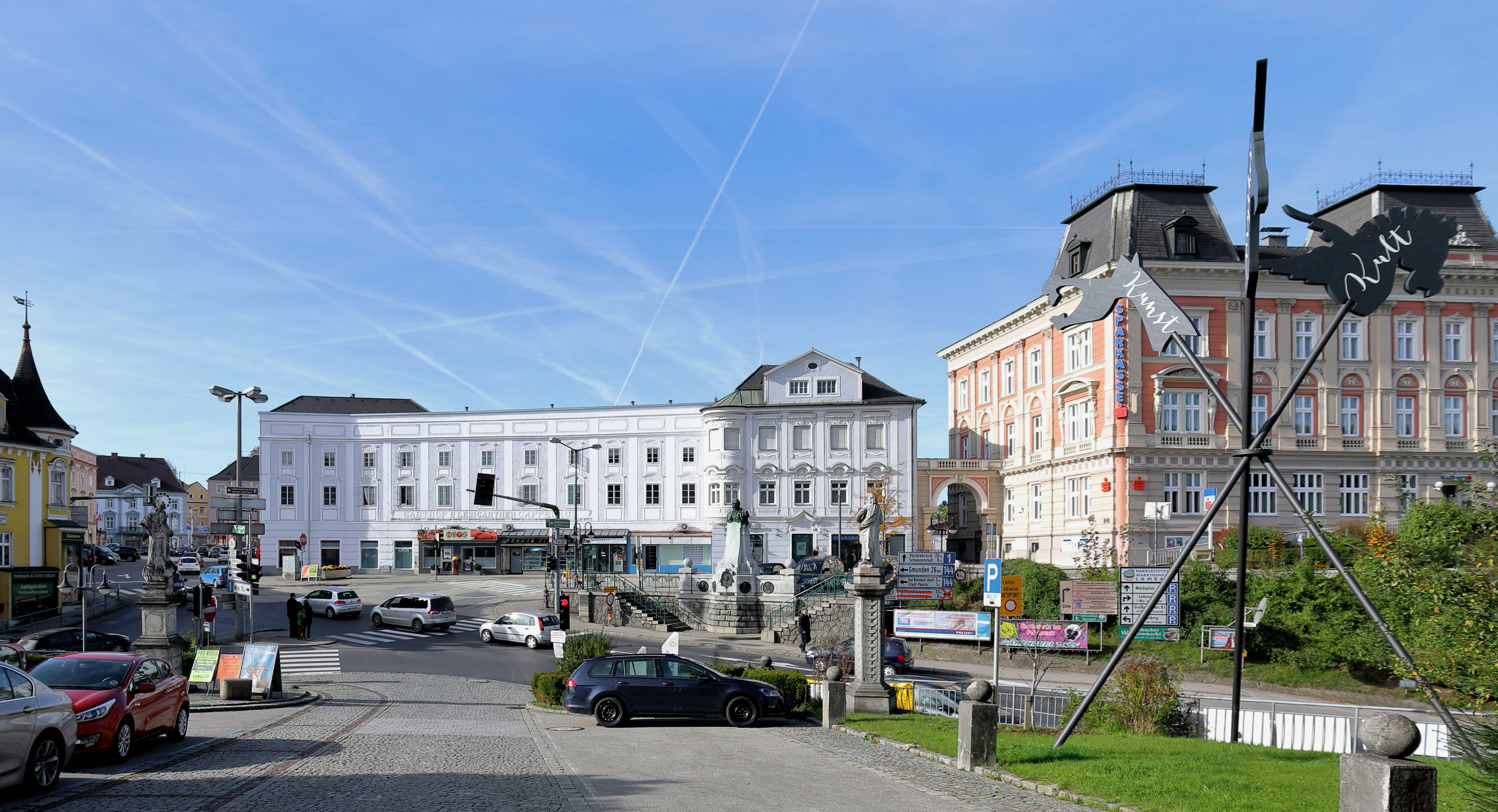

- Coat of arms

- Location within Austria
- Coordinates: 48°05′40″N 13°52′39″E
- Country: Austria
- State: Upper Austria
- District: Wels-Land

Government
  - Mayor: Johannes Moser (ÖVP)

Area
  - Total: 3.74 km^{2} (1.44 sq mi)
- Elevation: 367 m (1,204 ft)

Population (2018-01-01)
  - Total: 3,435
  - Density: 918/km^{2} (2,380/sq mi)
- Time zone: UTC+1 (CET)
  - Summer (DST): UTC+2 (CEST)
- Postal code: 4650
- Area code: 07245
- Vehicle registration: WL
- Website: www.lambach.ooe.gv.at

Lambach (German pronunciation: [ˈlambax]) is a market town in the Wels-Land district of the Austrian state of Upper Austria on the Ager and Traun Rivers. A major stop on the salt trade, it is the site of the Lambach Abbey, built around 1056. Notable alumnus from the local elementary school is Adolf Hitler, who attended the establishment in the 1890s.

== History ==
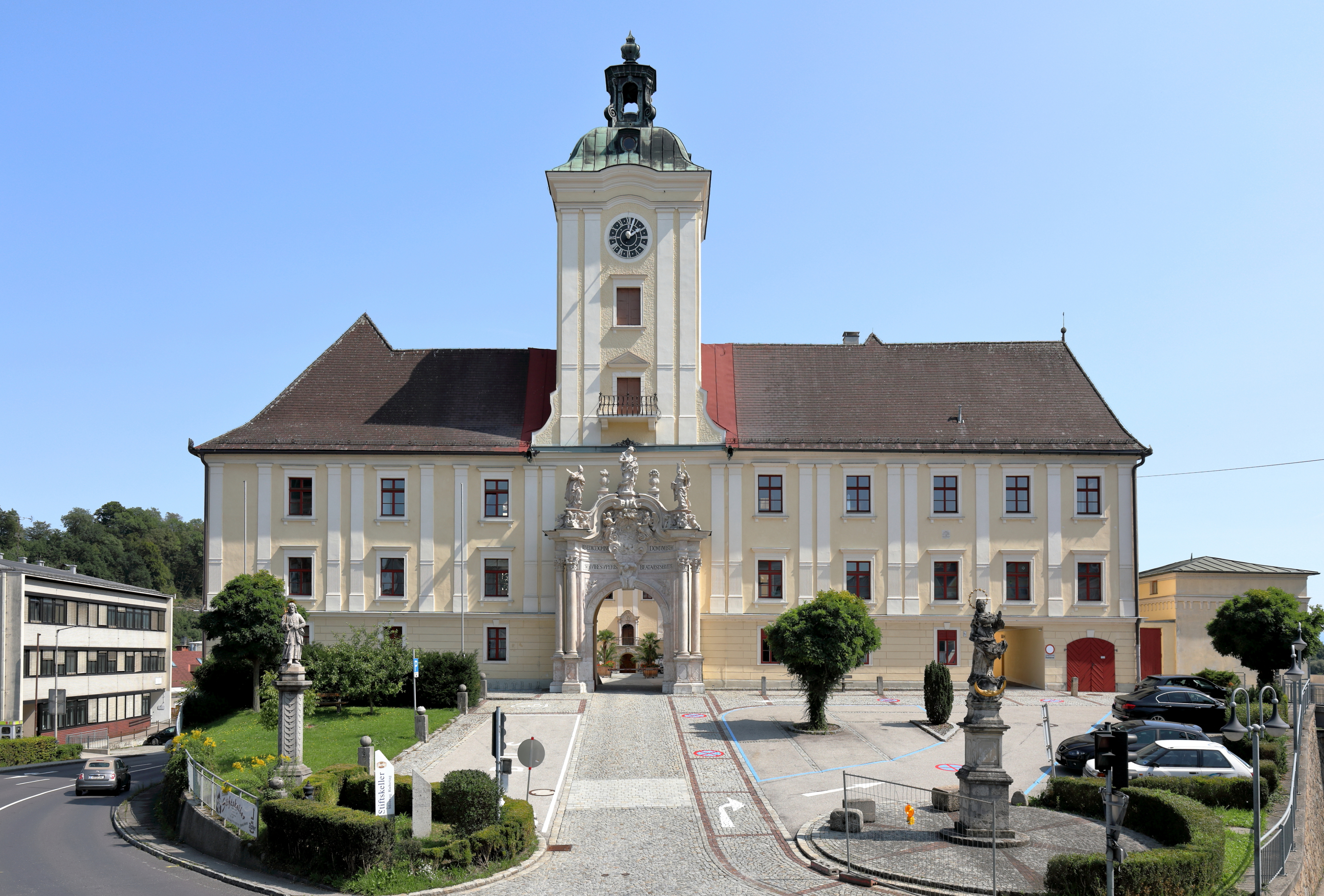
Lambach Abbey

The famous Abbey of Lambach was founded in 1056 by bishop Adalbero of Würzburg.

== Population ==
Historical population
Year	Pop.	±%
1991	3,432	—
2001	3,242	−5.5%

== Personalities ==
- Anton Edler von Gapp, the noted Austrian jurist, was born in Lambach.
- Lambach was the home of Dr. Ignaz Harrer who, from 1872 to 1875, was the mayor of Salzburg.
- Adolf Hitler lived here from 1897–1898. He attended 3rd grade in the local primary school.
- Hitler's father Alois Hitler, purchased a farmhouse called Rauscher Gut along with a 3.6-hectare (9-acre) plot of land in 1895 after he retired, and moved his family to the farm.
