= Anton Edler von Gapp =

Austrian lawyer and professor of law (1778–1862)

- Born: 24 March 1778; Lambach, Habsburg monarchy
- Died: 1 April 1862 (aged 84); Linz, Austrian Empire
- Scientific career
- Fields: law
- Workplaces: University of Olomouc; University of Vienna

Anton Edler von Gapp (24 March 1778 – 1 April 1862) was an Austrian lawyer and professor of law. In 1821, he was the Rector of the Olomouc Lyceum.

After finishing his law studies in 1806, von Gapp went to teach as a substitute at the (standard) Lyceum in Linz. He became professor at the lyceum in 1810. In 1816, he moved to Olomouc, where he became professor of Roman and canonical law at the (academic) Lyceum (now Palacký University of Olomouc). He was the director of the faculty of law between the years 1826 and 1834, and in 1821 he was the rector of the Olomouc Lyceum. In 1835–1848, he was teaching Roman law at the Faculty of Law of University of Vienna.

His son was Wesener Gapp.

== Works ==
- Gapp, Anton Edler von (1828). "Erörtörung der Begriffe: redlicher — unredlicher Besitzer; — rechtmäßiger — unrechtmäßiger; — echter — unechter Besitz; nach den Bestimmungen des öfter, allg. bürg. G. B." Oesterreichische Zeitschrift für Rechts- und Staatswissenschaft (1, 2).

== Sources ==
- Gerhard Köbler:Österreich
