= Cornelis Vollenhoven =

Nineteenth century Dutch politician

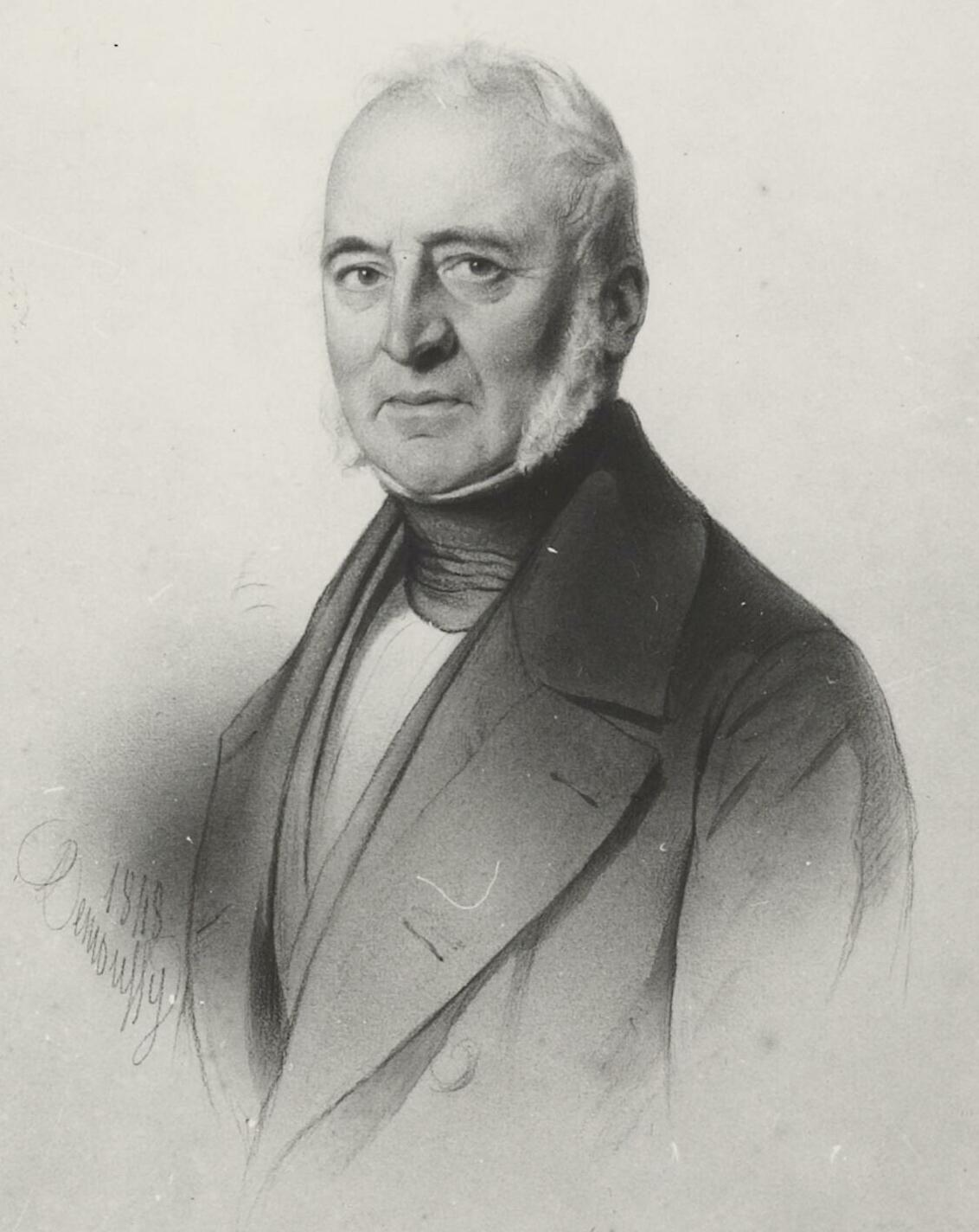
Cornelis Vollenhoven

Cornelis Vollenhoven (3 February 1778, Amsterdam – 14 November 1849, The Hague) was a Dutch politician.
