= Otto Christian Blandow =

German apothecary and botanist (1778-1810)

Otto Christian Blandow (5 August 1778 – 15 March 1810) was a German apothecary and botanist, specializing in the field of bryology.

He trained under Joachim Christian Timm (1734–1805) in Malchin, afterwards working as an apothecary in Rostock, Neubrandenburg, Anklam, Woldegk and Waren.

The genus Blandowia was named in his honor by Carl Ludwig Willdenow (1765–1812). He edited two exsiccatae: Musci frondosi exsiccati (1804–1810) and Systematisch-tabellarische Sammlung von Laubmoosen (1808). Since 1875, a collection of his mosses has been kept at the British Museum of Natural History (250 specimens in 5 fascicles).

== Publications ==
- Index muscorum frondosorum exsiccatorum: fasciculi primi [-quinti], 1804.
- Systematisch-tabellarische Sammlung von Laubmoosen, 1808 – Systematic-tabular collection of mosses.
- Uebersicht der Mecklenburgischen Moose nach alphábetischer Ordnung, 1809 – Survey of mosses from Mecklenburg in alphabetical order.
