= EQ-53 =

Insecticide

In 1953, formula EQ-53, for an emulsifiable DDT concentrate for use in homes and commercial laundries to mothproof washable woolens, was released to the public by the United States Department of Agriculture "after four years of experimentation". The concentrate contained 25% DDT, 1% non-ionic detergent emulsifier, and 65% aromatic hydrocarbon solvent.
