= Marcus Pløen =

Norwegian timber merchant and politician

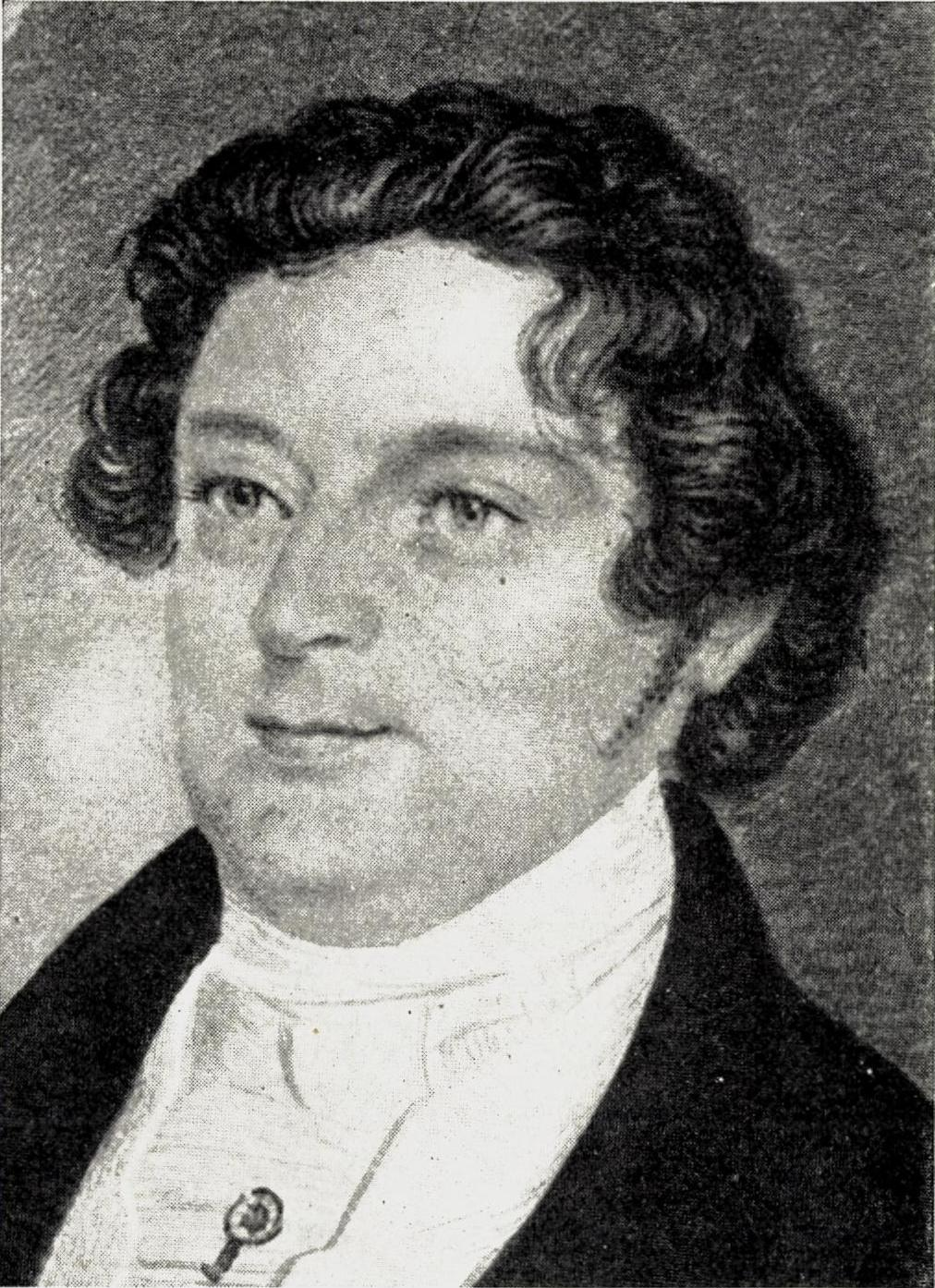
Marcus Pløen, Illustration from the book "Det gamle Christiania" by Daae, Ludvig

Marcus Pløen (11 August 1778 – 11 July 1836) was a Norwegian timber merchant and politician.
