= Franz Xaver Heller =

German physician and botanist (1778–1840)

Franz Xaver Heller (28 December 1778, Würzburg – 20 December 1840) was a German medical doctor and botanist.

He studied medicine at the University of Würzburg, graduating in 1800 with doctorates in medicine and surgery. In 1803 he became an associate professor at Würzburg, and two years later was appointed a full professor of botany. In 1828 he was named rector of the university. During the same year, he became a corresponding member of the Medico-Botanical Society of London.

He is best known as author of the Flora Wirceburgensis ("Flora of the Grand Duchy of Würzburg"), published in two parts (1810, 1811), with a supplement issued in 1815. After his death, his herbarium was passed on to botanist August Schenk (1815-1891).

In 1824, the genus Helleria (family Humiriaceae) was named in honor of him and his brother, Georg, by Nees and Martius.

== Published works ==
- "Graminum in magno-ducatu Wirceburgensi tam sponte crescentium : quam cultorum enumeratio systematica", 1809.
- "Flora Wirceburgensis, sive, Plantarum in Magno-Ducatu Wirceburgensi indigenarum enumeratio systematica", 1810–11.
- "Supplementum Florae Wirceburgensis continens Plantarum genera : quaedam atque species in magno-ducatu Wirceburgensi recenter detecta", 1815.
