= George Philipp Ludolf von Beckedorff =

Prussian Roman Catholic convert and parliamentarian

George Philipp Ludolf von Beckedorff (1778 – 1858) was a prominent Prussian Roman Catholic convert and parliamentarian.

== Life ==
Beckedorff was born on 14 April 1778 in Hanover.

He first studied theology at Jena, then medicine at Göttingen, where he obtained the degree of doctor in 1799. In 1810 he gave up the medical profession and accepted the office of tutor to the crown-prince of Anhalt-Bernburg. For seven years he lived at Ballenstedt.

In the movement for the reunion of the churches, then agitating the various religious sects, he took an active part by able and timely publications. An appeal "To Young Men of Germany over the body of the murdered Kotzebue" brought him into a wider field of action. The Prussian Government secured his services, and he became a member, first of the High Privy Council, then of the Ministry of Public Worship, and later on, supervisor of the public school system. In this capacity he contributed largely, in co-operation with Nicolovius, to the uplifting of popular education and published in nine volumes the "Year Book of the Prussian Schools". The State recognized his efficiency by appointing him attorney-general for the University of Berlin. His official duties and inclinations kept Beckedorff in close touch with the religious union movement and while studying the history and claims of the various sects, his conviction became stronger that the Catholic Church was the true Apostolic Church. It was not an easy step for one in his position to follow up his conviction; but the death of a beloved child decided him and he informed the king of his resolve. The kindly crown-prince advised a consultation with Bishop Sailer of Ratisbon, and a few days' intercourse with this prelate sufficed to prepare Beckedorff for abjuration, Holy Communion, and Confirmation in June, 1827. His dismissal from public office quickly followed and he withdrew with his family from the capital to Grünhof in Pomerania.

Beckedorff now devoted himself to the management of his estate and the education of his children, but his abilities were too marked to suffer this retirement for long. In spite of repeated refusals of the Government to ratify his election, his admiring countrymen chose him again as their deputy. It was not until the accession of King Frederick William, however, that his rights and merits were recognized. In reparation for the injustice done, the king raised him to the nobility and made him president of the state agricultural department. Two volumes on agricultural economy attest his competence in an entirely new office and his zeal in the service of his country. With the still higher aim of furthering religious union and peace he published several works on the mutual relations of family, school, State, and Church. His work, "The Catholic Truth, Words of Peace", went through three editions and still ranks as an excellent popular manual of apologetics. Nowhere was Beckedorff's influence felt more than at Grünhof and in its neighbourhood. Having learned that some Catholics were scattered throughout the district, he built a church for them and maintained the resident priest in his own house. He founded also a school and home for poor children and entrusted them to the Sisters of Charity; both of these institutions began to flourish during his lifetime.

He died on 27 February 1858 in Grünhof.
