= Arvid David Hummel =

Swedish entomologist (1778–1836)

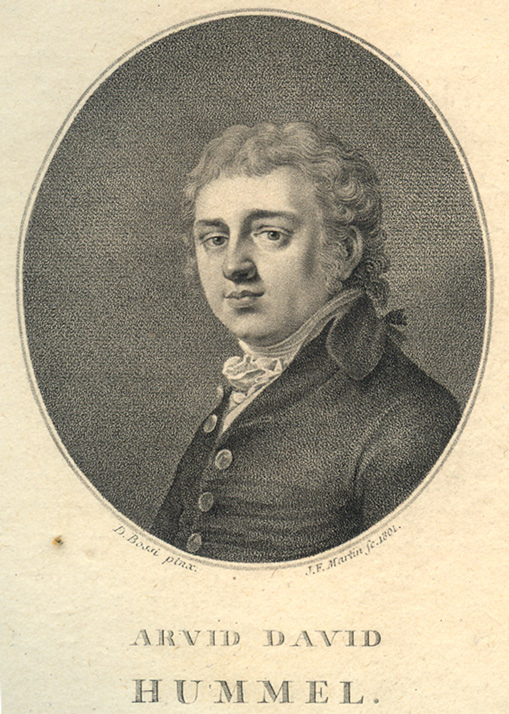
- Born: 30 April 1778
- Died: 20 October 1836 (aged 58)

Arvid David Hummel (30 April 1778 in Gothenburg – 20 October 1836 in Ekenäs) was a Swedish entomologist.

Hummel was a notary. He wrote Essais entomologiques. St. Pétersbourg: de l'Imprimerie de la Chancellerie privée du Ministère de l'Intérieur, 1821–29.
