= List of fungicides =

This is a list of fungicides. These are chemical compounds which have been registered as agricultural fungicides. The names on the list are the ISO common name for the active ingredient which is formulated into the branded product sold to end-users. The University of Hertfordshire maintains a database of the chemical and biological properties of these materials, including their brand names and the countries and dates where and when they have been introduced. The industry-sponsored Fungicide Resistance Action Committee (FRAC) advises on the use of fungicides in crop protection and classifies the available compounds according to their chemical structures and mechanism of action so as to manage the risks of pesticide resistance developing. The 2024 FRAC poster of fungicides includes the majority of chemicals listed below. The British Crop Production Council also publishes information on ISO common names of new fungicides.

== 0-9 ==
- (3-ethoxypropyl)mercury bromide
- 2-methoxyethylmercury chloride
- 2-phenylphenol
- 2,4,5-trichlorophenol
- 2,2-dibromo-3-nitrilopropionamide
- 8-hydroxyquinoline
- 8-phenylmercurioxyquinoline

== A ==
- acibenzolar
- acypetacs
- albendazole
- aldimorph
- allicin
- allyl alcohol
- allyl isothiocyanate
- ametoctradin
- aminopyrifen
- aminotipyr
- amisulbrom
- amobam
- ampropylfos
- anilazine
- asomate
- aureofungin
- azaconazole
- azithiram
- azoxystrobin

== B ==
- barium polysulfide
- benalaxyl
- benodanil
- benomyl
- benquinox
- bentaluron
- benthiavalicarb
- benzalkonium chloride
- benzamacril
- benzamide fungicides
- benzamorf
- benzimidazole fungicides
- benzohydroxamic acid
- benzovindiflupyr
- berberine
- bethoxazin
- bifemetstrobin
- bifujunzhi
- binapacryl
- biphenyl
- bitertanol
- bithionol
- bixafen
- blasticidin-S
- Bordeaux mixture
- boric acid
- boscalid
- bromothalonil
- bromuconazole
- bronopol
- bupirimate
- Burgundy mixture
- buthiobate
- sec-butylamine

== C ==
- calcium polysulfide
- captafol
- captan
- carbamorph
- carbendazim
- carboxin
- carmeconazole
- carpropamid
- carvacrol
- carvone
- cetoctaelat
- Cheshunt mixture
- chinomethionat
- chitosan
- chlobenthiazone
- chloraniformethane
- chloranil
- chlorfenazole
- chlorodinitronaphthalene
- chloroinconazide
- chloroneb
- chloropicrin
- chlorothalonil
- chlorquinox
- chlozolinate
- ciclopirox
- climbazole
- clotrimazole
- copper(II) acetate
- copper(II) carbonate, basic
- copper hydroxide
- copper naphthenate
- copper oleate
- copper(I) oxide
- copper oxychloride
- copper(II) sulfate
- copper zinc chromate
- coumoxystrobin
- cresol
- cufraneb
- cuprobam
- cyanogen
- cyazofamid
- cyclafuramid
- cyclobunofen
- cyclobutrifluram
- cycloheximide
- cyflufenamid
- cymoxanil
- cypendazole
- cyproconazole
- cyprodinil
- cyprofuram

== D ==
- dazomet
- DBCP
- debacarb
- decafentin
- dehydroacetic acid
- dicarboximide fungicides
- dichlobentiazox
- dichlofluanid
- dichlone
- dichlorophen
- dichlozoline
- diclobutrazol
- diclocymet
- diclomezine
- dicloran
- diethofencarb
- diethyl pyrocarbonate
- difenoconazole
- diflumetorim
- dimefluazole
- dimetachlone
- dimethirimol
- dimethomorph
- dimethyl disulfide
- dimoxystrobin
- diniconazole
- dinobuton
- dinocap
- dinocton
- dinopenton
- dinosulfon
- dinoterbon
- diphenylamine
- dipymetitrone
- dipyrithione
- disodium octaborate
- disulfiram
- ditalimfos
- dithianon
- DNOC
- dodemorph
- dodicin
- dodine
- drazoxolon

== E ==
- edifenphos
- enoxastrobin
- enprocymid
- epoxiconazole
- etaconazole
- etem
- ethaboxam
- ethirimol
- ethoxyquin
- ethylene oxide
- ethylicin
- ethylmercury 2,3-dihydroxypropyl mercaptide
- ethylmercury acetate
- ethylmercury bromide
- ethylmercury chloride
- ethylmercury phosphate
- etridiazole

== F ==
- famoxadone
- fenamidone
- fenaminosulf
- fenaminstrobin
- fenapanil
- fenarimol
- fenazaquin
- fenbuconazole
- feneptamidoquin
- fenfuram
- fenhexamid
- fenitropan
- fenjuntong
- fenopyramid
- fenoxanil
- fenpiclonil
- fenpicoxamid
- fenpropidin
- fenpropimorph
- fenpyrazamine
- fentin
- ferbam
- ferimzone
- florylpicoxamid
- fluazinam
- flubeneteram
- fluconazole
- fludioxonil
- flufenoxadiazam
- flufenoxystrobin
- fluindapyr
- flumetover
- flumorph
- fluopicolide
- fluopimomide
- fluopyram
- fluoroimide
- fluotrimazole
- fluoxapiprolin
- fluoxastrobin
- fluoxytioconazole
- fluquinconazole
- flusilazole
- flusulfamide
- flutianil
- flutolanil
- flutriafol
- fluxapyroxad
- folpet
- formaldehyde
- fosetyl
- fuberidazole
- furalaxyl
- furametpyr
- furcarbanil
- furconazole
- furfural
- furmecyclox
- furophanate

== G ==
- glyodin
- griseofulvin
- guazatine

== H ==
- halacrinate
- hexachlorobenzene
- hexachlorobutadiene
- hexachlorophene
- hexaconazole
- hexylthiofos
- hanjunzuo
- hydrargaphen
- hymexazol

== I ==
- imazalil
- imibenconazole
- iminoctadine
- inezin
- inpyrfluxam
- iodocarb
- ipconazole
- ipfentrifluconazole
- ipflufenoquin
- iprobenfos
- iprodione
- iprovalicarb
- isavuconazole
- isofetamid
- isoflucypram
- isoprothiolane
- isopyrazam
- isotianil
- isovaledione
- itraconazole
- izopamfos

== J ==
- jiaxiangjunzhi

== K ==
- kasugamycin
- kejunlin
- ketoconazole
- kresoxim-methyl

== L ==
- Lime sulfur

== M ==
- mancopper
- mancozeb
- mandestrobin
- mandipropamid
- maneb
- mebenil
- mecarbinzid
- mefentrifluconazole
- mepanipyrim
- mepitriflufenpyr
- mepronil
- meptyldinocap
- metcyclofenstrobin
- mercuric chloride
- mercuric oxide
- mercurous chloride
- metalaxyl
- metam
- metarylpicoxamid
- metazoxolon
- metconazole
- methasulfocarb
- methfuroxam
- methyl bromide
- methyl isothiocyanate
- methylmercury benzoate
- methylmercury dicyandiamide
- methylmercury pentachlorophenoxide
- metiram
- metomeclan
- metominostrobin
- metrafenone
- metsulfovax
- metyltetraprole
- milneb
- moroxydine
- myclobutanil
- myclozolin

== N ==
- N-(ethylmercury)-p-toluenesulfonanilide
- nabam
- natamycin
- ningnanmycin
- nystatin
- β-nitrostyrene
- nitrothal-isopropyl
- nuarimol

== O ==
- OCH
- octhilinone
- ofurace
- organotin fungicides (obsolete)
- orthophenyl phenol
- orysastrobin
- osthol
- oxadixyl
- oxine copper
- oxpoconazole
- oxycarboxin
- oxyfenthiin

== P ==
- paclobutrazol
- parinol
- pefurazoate
- penconazole
- pencycuron
- penflufen
- pentachlorophenol
- penthiopyrad
- phenamacril
- phenylmercuriurea
- phenylmercury acetate
- phenylmercury chloride
- phenylmercury derivative of pyrocatechol
- phenylmercury nitrate
- phenylmercury salicylate
- phosdiphen
- phthalide
- picarbutrazox
- picoxystrobin
- piperalin
- polycarbamate
- polyoxins
- polyoxorim
- posaconazole
- potassium azide
- potassium polysulfide
- potassium thiocyanate
- pramiconazole
- probenazole
- prochloraz
- procymidone
- propamocarb
- propiconazole
- propineb
- proquinazid
- prothiocarb
- prothioconazole
- pydiflumetofen
- pyracarbolid
- pyraclostrobin
- pyrametostrobin
- pyraoxystrobin
- pyrapropoyne
- pyraziflumid
- pyrazole fungicides
- pyrazophos
- pyribencarb
- pyributicarb
- pyridachlometyl
- pyridinitril
- pyrifenox
- pyrimethanil
- pyriofenone
- pyrisoxazole
- pyroquilon
- pyroxychlor
- pyroxyfur

== Q ==
- quinacetol
- quinaminoprole
- quinazamid
- quinconazole
- quinofumelin
- quinoxyfen
- quintozene

== R ==
- rabenzazole
- ravuconazole

== S ==
- saijunmao
- saisentong
- salicylanilide
- sanguinarine
- santonin
- seboctylamine
- sedaxane
- silthiofam
- silver
- simeconazole
- sodium azide
- sodium bicarbonate
- sodium orthophenylphenoxide
- sodium pentachlorophenoxide
- sodium polysulfide
- spiroxamine
- streptomycin
- strobilurin fungicides
- sulfur
- sulfuryl fluoride
- sultropen

== T ==
- TCMTB
- tebuconazole
- tebufloquin
- tecloftalam
- tecnazene
- tecoram
- tetraconazole
- thiabendazole
- thiadifluor
- thicyofen
- thifluzamide
- thiochlorfenphim
- thiocyanatodinitrobenzenes
- thiodiazole-copper
- thiomersal
- thiophanate
- thiophanate-methyl
- thioquinox
- thiram
- thujaplicins
- thymol
- tiadinil
- tioxymid
- tolclofos-methyl
- tolfenpyrad
- tolnaftate
- tolnifanide
- tolprocarb
- tolylfluanid
- tolylmercury acetate
- triadimefon
- triadimenol
- triamiphos
- triarimol
- triazbutil
- triazoxide
- tributyltin oxide
- trichlamide
- trichlorotrinitrobenzenes
- triclopyricarb
- tricyclazole
- tridemorph
- trifloxystrobin
- triflumizole
- triforine
- trimorphamide
- triticonazole

== U ==
- Undecylenic acid
- uniconazole
- urbacide

== V ==
- validamycin
- valifenalate
- vangard
- vinclozolin
- voriconazole

== Z ==
- zarilamid
- zinc naphthenate
- zineb
- ziram
- zoxamide

== See also ==
- Biopesticide
- Federal Insecticide, Fungicide, and Rodenticide Act
- Fungicide use in the United States
- List of insecticides
- List of herbicides
