= C18H35NO =

The molecular formula C_{18}H_{35}NO (molar mass: 281.48 g/mol) may refer to:

- Oleamide
- Dodemorph
