= C14H21NO4 =

The molecular formula C_{14}H_{21}NO_{4} (molar mass: 267.33 g/mol) may refer to:

- Diethofencarb
- Weberine
