= 1-Bromo-4-fluorobenzene =

4-Bromofluorobenzene
Skeletal Structure of 4-Bromofluorobenzene
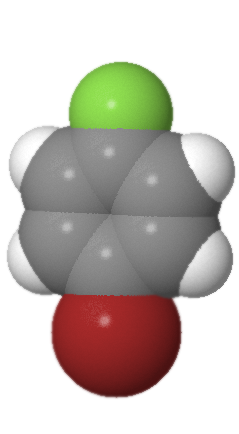
Space Filling Model of 4-Bromofluorobenzene

Names
- Preferred IUPAC name 1-Bromo-4-fluorobenzene
- Other names p-Bromofluorobenzene p-Fluorophenyl bromide

Identifiers
CAS Number	460-00-4
3D model (JSmol)	Interactive image
Abbreviations	PBFB
ChEBI	CHEBI:141551
ChEMBL	ChEMBL1876826
ChemSpider	13875180
ECHA InfoCard	100.006.638
EC Number	207-300-2
PubChem CID	9993
UNII	A7ZH69I3KH
UN number	1993
CompTox Dashboard (EPA)	DTXSID4027153
- InChI: InChI=1S/C6H4BrF/c7-5-1-3-6(8)4-2-5/h1-4H Key: AITNMTXHTIIIBB-UHFFFAOYSA-N; InChI=1S/C6H4BrF/c7-5-1-3-6(8)4-2-5/h1-4H Key: AITNMTXHTIIIBB-UHFFFAOYSA-N
- SMILES: c1cc(ccc1F)Br

Properties
Chemical formula	C_{6}H_{4}BrF
Molar mass	175.000 g·mol^{−1}
Appearance	colorless liquid
Melting point	−16 °C (3 °F; 257 K)
Boiling point	150 °C (302 °F; 423 K)
Solubility in water	Insoluble

Structure
Molecular shape	Planar

Hazards
- GHS labelling
Pictograms	(GHS02: Flammable) (GHS07: Exclamation mark)
Signal word	Warning
Hazard statements	H226, H302, H312, H315, H319, H332, H335, H336
Precautionary statements	P210, P233, P240, P241, P242, P243, P261, P264, P270, P271, P280, P301+P312, P302+P352, P303+P361+P353, P304+P312, P304+P340, P305+P351+P338, P312, P321, P322, P330, P332+P313, P337+P313, P362, P363, P370+P378, P403+P233, P403+P235, P405, P501
NFPA 704 (fire diamond)	1 2 0

Related compounds
Related halobenzenes	1,4-Dichlorobenzene; 1,4-Dibromobenzene; 1,4-Diiodobenzene
Related compounds	Benzene; 1,4-Difluorobenzene
- Except where otherwise noted, data are given for materials in their standard state (at 25 °C [77 °F], 100 kPa). Infobox references

4-Fluorobromobenzene is a mixed aryl halide (aryl fluoride and aryl bromide) with the formula C_{6}H_{4}BrF. It is a derivative of benzene, with a bromine atom bonded para to a fluorine atom. It has uses as a precursor to some pharmaceuticals, as an agrochemical intermediate, and in organic synthesis. It is a colorless liquid of low acute toxicity.

== Production and uses ==
4-Fluorobromobenzene is synthesized via bromination of fluorobenzene in the presence of a Lewis acid catalyst such as iron(III) bromide or aluminium tribromide.

4-Bromofluorobenzene is regarded by the Toxic Substances Control Act as a high production volume chemical, that is, a chemical that 1 million pounds (about 500 tonnes) per year is either produced in or imported to the United States. As of 2002, companies producing or importing this compound reported 10 million (4,536,000 kilograms) used. This is up from 500,000 pounds (226,800 kilograms) used in 1986, as reported in the Inventory Update Rule of the Toxic Substances Control Act.

== Reactions ==
4-Bromofluorobenzene is a standard substrate for cross-coupling reactions It forms a Grignard reagent used in the synthesis of 4-fluorophenyl containing compounds, such as the pesticide Flusilazole.

== Drugs List ==
1. WIN-35428
2. SCH-57871
3. Tefludazine & Irindalone
4. Seganserin
5. Setoperone
6. Citalopram
7. Paroxetine (from arecoline)

== Safety ==
This compound is a flammable liquid. It has a flash point of 53 °C.
