= Triazole =

Chemical compound

A triazole is a heterocyclic compound comprising a five-membered ring of two carbon atoms and three nitrogen atoms with molecular formula C_{2}H_{3}N_{3}. Triazoles exhibit substantial isomerism, depending on the positioning of the nitrogen atoms within the ring.

Many triazoles are versatile, biologically active compounds commonly used as fungicides and plant retardants. However, triazoles are also useful in bioorthogonal chemistry, because the large number of nitrogen atoms causes triazoles to react similarly to azides. The many free lone pairs in triazoles also make them useful as coordination compounds, although not typically as haptic ligands.

== Isomerism ==
There are four triazole isomers, which are conventionally divided into two pairs of tautomers. For 1,2,3-triazoles, the three nitrogen atoms are adjacent, while for 1,2,4-triazoles, one nitrogen atom is isolated from the other nitrogen pair by the carbon atoms. Each category has two tautomers based on which nitrogen has a hydrogen bonded to it.

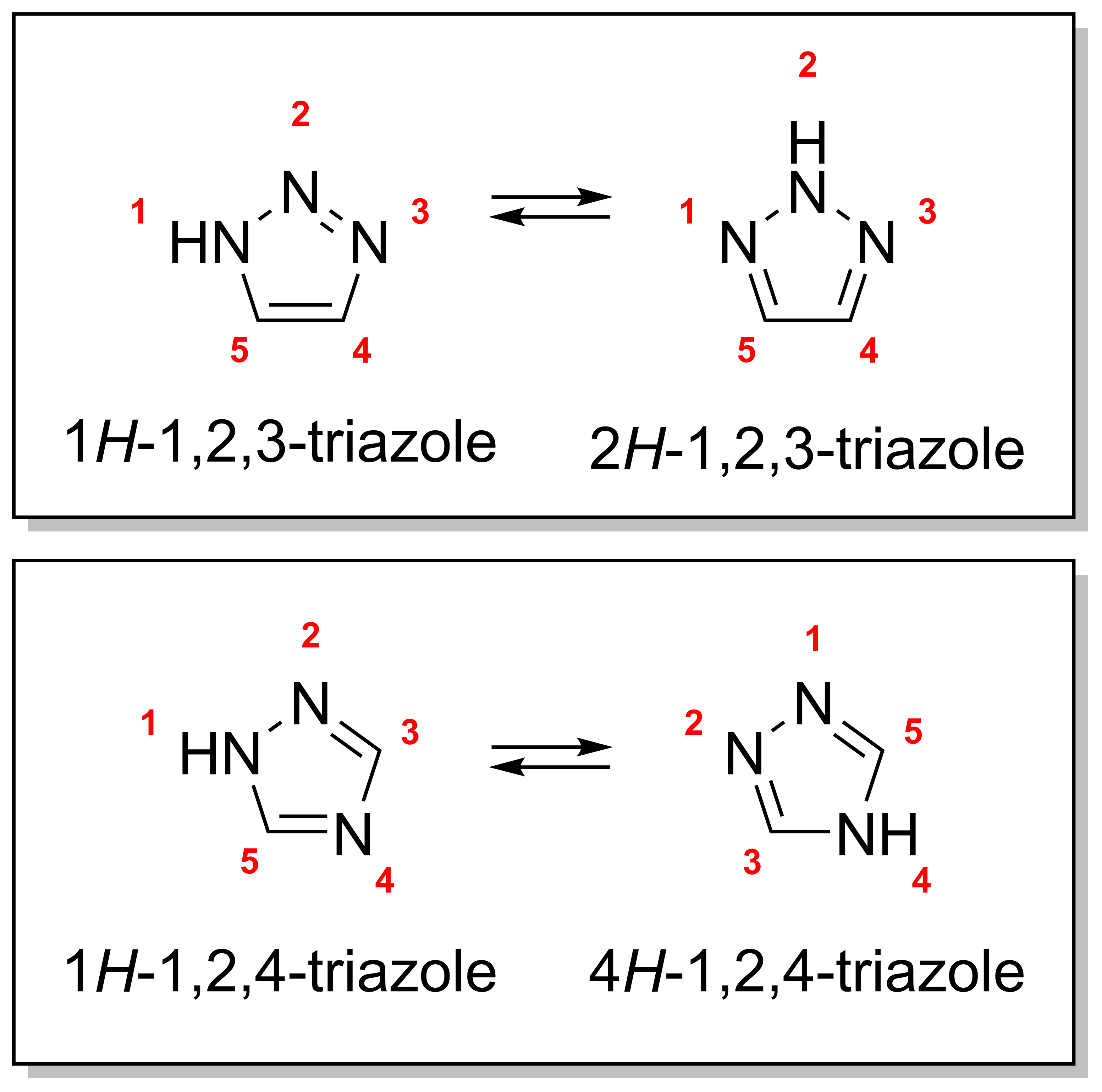

== Preparation ==
There are several methods to prepare triazoles.

=== 1,2,3-Triazoles ===
1,2,3-Triazoles, also known as vicinal triazoles, are usually prepared following (3 + 2) cycloaddition protocols. A common technique for unsubstituted triazoles is the Huisgen azide-alkyne 1,3-dipolar cycloaddition, where an azide and an alkyne react at high temperature to form a ring. However, the Huisgen strategy produces a mixture of isomers (typically 1,4- and 1,5-disubstituted) when used to produce substituted triazoles.

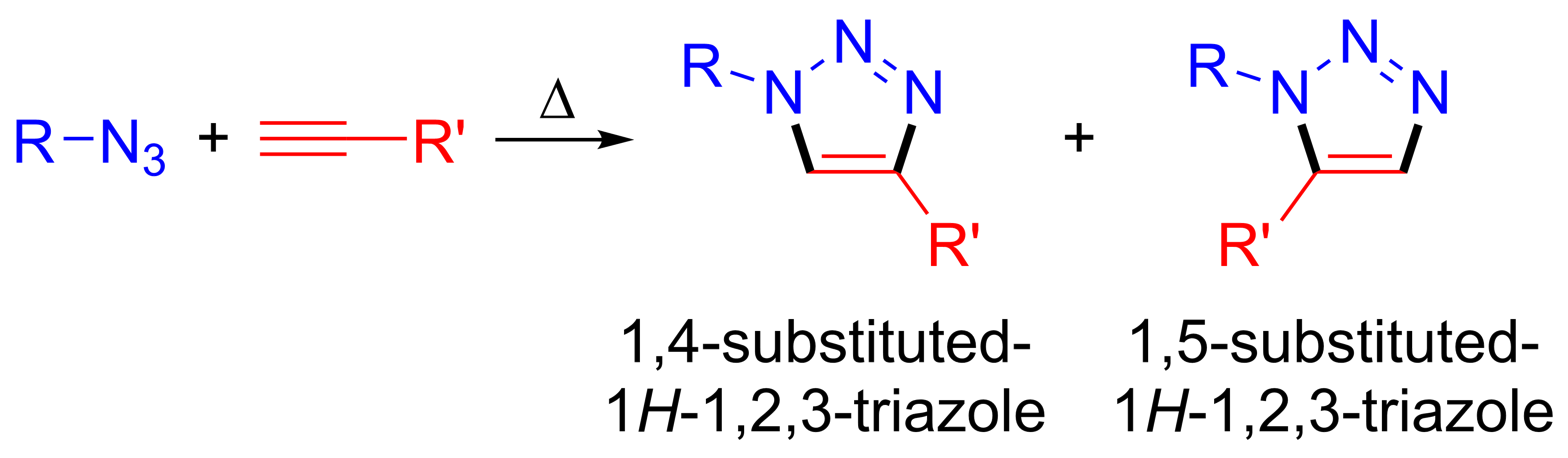
Thermal addition gives a mixture of 1,4 and 1,5 isomers

In order to selectively prepare a desired isomer, metal catalysts are employed. In the copper-catalysed azide-alkyne cycloaddition (CuAAC), copper(I) salts select for the formation of 1,4-disubstituted 1,2,3-triazoles. One such catalyst is CuBr(PPh_{3})_{3}, which is relatively stable towards oxidation even at elevated temperatures and can produce triazoles with a broad range of substituents either in solvent or under neat reaction conditions.

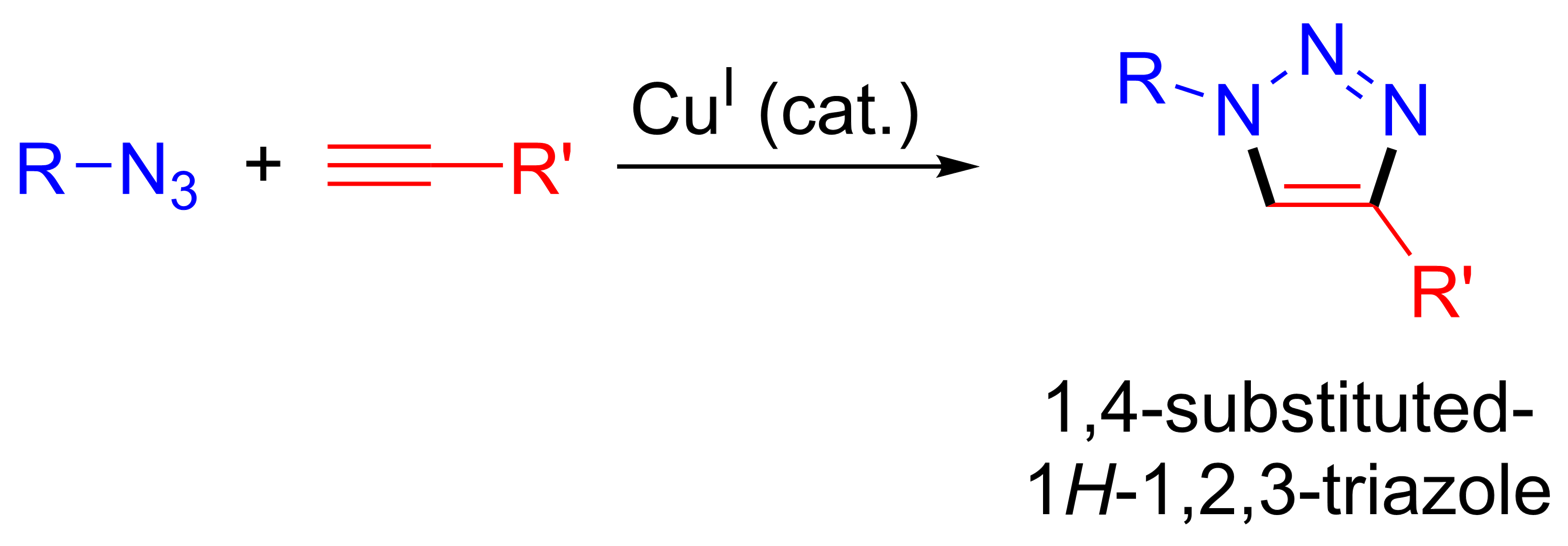
1,4 isomer from a Cu^{I} catalyst

Conversely, ruthenium catalysts (RuAAC) select for 1,5-disubstituted 1,2,3-triazoles.

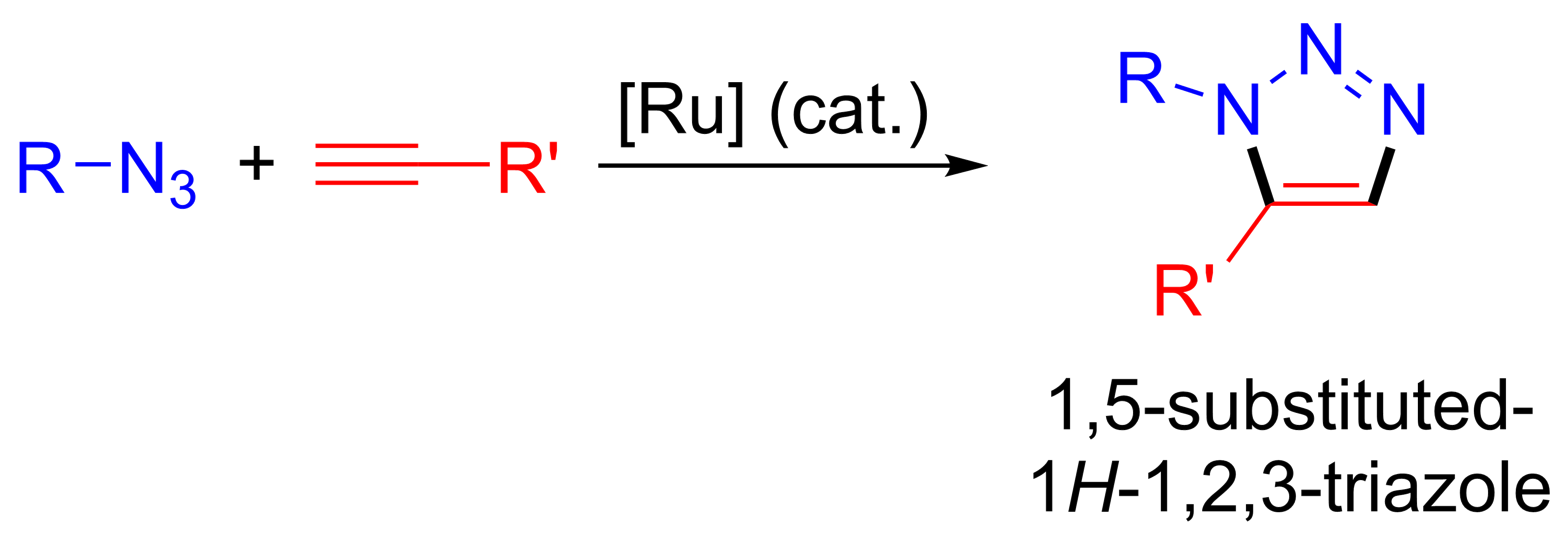
1,5 isomer from a Ru catalyst

=== 1,2,4-Triazoles ===
Most techniques for producing 1,2,4-triazoles use the free energy of water, either by dehydrating a mixture of amides and hydrazides (the Pellizzari reaction) or imides and alkyl hydrazines (the Einhorn–Brunner reaction). Of those two, only the Einhorn–Brunner reaction is regioselective. Recent research has focused on grinding and microwave irradiation as greener substitutes.

== Applications ==
Triazoles are compounds with a vast spectrum of applications, varying from materials (polymers), agricultural chemicals, pharmaceuticals, photoactive chemicals and dyes.

Benzotriazole is used in various industrial processes.

Cyclohexylethyltriazol (4-cyclohexyl-5-ethyl-2H-triazole) was briefly used as an alternative to Cardiazol (Metrazol) in the treatment of mental illnesses during the 1940s.

=== Antifungals ===
Many triazoles have antifungal effects. The triazole antifungal drugs include fluconazole, isavuconazole, itraconazole, voriconazole, pramiconazole, ravuconazole, and posaconazole. Triazole plant-protection fungicides include epoxiconazole, triadimenol, myclobutanil, propiconazole, prothioconazole, metconazole, cyproconazole, tebuconazole, flusilazole and paclobutrazol.

Due to spreading resistance of plant pathogens towards fungicides of the strobilurin class, control of fungi such as Septoria tritici or Gibberella zeae relies heavily on triazoles. Food, like store-bought potatoes, contains retardants such as triazole or tetcyclacis.

In addition, paclobutrazol, uniconazole, flutriafol, and triadimefon are used as plant growth regulators. Brassinazole inhibits brassinosteroid biosynthesis.

=== Importance in chemical synthesis ===
The azide alkyne Huisgen cycloaddition is a mild and selective reaction that gives 1,2,3-triazoles as products. The reaction has been widely used in bioorthogonal chemistry and in organic synthesis. Triazoles are relatively stable functional groups and triazole linkages can be used in a variety of applications, e.g. replacing the phosphate backbone of DNA.

== Related heterocycles ==
- Imidazole, an analog with two nonadjacent nitrogen atoms
- Pyrazole, an analog with two adjacent nitrogen atoms
- Tetrazole, an analog with four nitrogen atoms
- Triazolium salts, substituted analogues that can be used as NHC precursors
