= Dodemorph =

Names
- IUPAC name 4-cyclododecyl-2,6-dimethylmorpholine
- Other names: Doazine; Dodemorphe; Meltatox

Identifiers
CAS Number	1593-77-7
3D model (JSmol)	Interactive image
ChEBI	CHEBI:81960
ChemSpider	55760
ECHA InfoCard	100.014.978
EC Number	216-474-9
KEGG	C18786
PubChem CID	61899
CompTox Dashboard (EPA)	DTXSID5041019
- InChI: InChI=1S/C18H35NO/c1-16-14-19(15-17(2)20-16)18-12-10-8-6-4-3-5-7-9-11-13-18/h16-18H,3-15H2,1-2H3 Key: JMXKCYUTURMERF-UHFFFAOYSA-N
- SMILES: CC1CN(CC(O1)C)C2CCCCCCCCCCC2

Properties
Chemical formula	C_{18}H_{35}NO
Molar mass	281.484 g·mol^{−1}
Density	0.93 g·cm^{−3}

Hazards
- GHS labelling
Pictograms	(GHS05: Corrosive) (GHS07: Exclamation mark) (GHS08: Health hazard) (GHS09: Environmental hazard)
Signal word	Danger
Hazard statements	H314, H317, H361d, H373, H410
Precautionary statements	P203, P260, P264, P272, P273, P280, P301+P330+P331, P302+P352, P302+P361+P354, P304+P340, P305+P354+P338, P316, P318, P319, P321, P333+P317, P362+P364, P363, P391, P405, P501
- Except where otherwise noted, data are given for materials in their standard state (at 25 °C [77 °F], 100 kPa). Infobox references

Dodemorph is a pesticide belonging to the morpholine group.

== Stereochemistry ==
Chemically, dodemorph is a mixture of three stereoisomers:

- the meso compound,
- the (R,R) isomer, and
- the (S,S) isomer,

where the (R,R) and (S,S) isomers form a racemate, i.e., a 1:1 mixture. This mixture is also known as the trans isomer.

== Synthesis ==
Dodemorph can be synthesized by reacting cyclododecylamine with propylene oxide in the presence of sulfuric acid.

== History and use ==
Dodemorph was discovered by BASF in 1965 and introduced to the market as a fungicide in 1971. It was the first morpholine fungicide to be commercialized and thus also the first sterol biosynthesis inhibitor. It is used primarily to control powdery mildew. Dodemorph inhibits sterol Δ8/7-isomerase and sterol delta-14-reductase in the biosynthesis of ergosterol.

== Approval ==
In 2008, the European Commission added dodemorph to the list of active ingredients in plant protection products, restricting its use to “as a fungicide on ornamental plants in greenhouses.”

Dodemorph's approval in the European Union expired on August 31, 2024, and no products containing this active ingredient are currently available. No plant protection products containing dodemorph are approved in Switzerland either.
