= Opelconazole =

Chemical compound

Clinical data
- Other names: PC-945

Legal status
- Legal status: Investigational

Identifiers
- IUPAC name: 4-[4-[4-[[(3R,5R)-5-(2,4-Difluorophenyl)-5-(1,2,4-triazol-1-ylmethyl)oxolan-3-yl]methoxy]-3-methylphenyl]piperazin-1-yl]-N-(4-fluorophenyl)benzamide
- CAS Number: 1931946-73-4
- PubChem CID: 121383526
- UNII: 45LU8Q6ASU

Chemical and physical data
- Formula: C_{38}H_{37}F_{3}N_{6}O_{3}
- Molar mass: 682.748 g·mol^{−1}

Opelconazole (PC-945) is an experimental antifungal drug and the first triazole delivered via inhalation. The drug is in Phase III and Phase II trials as of 2023.
