= Nematicide =

Pesticide used to kill plant-parasitic nematodes

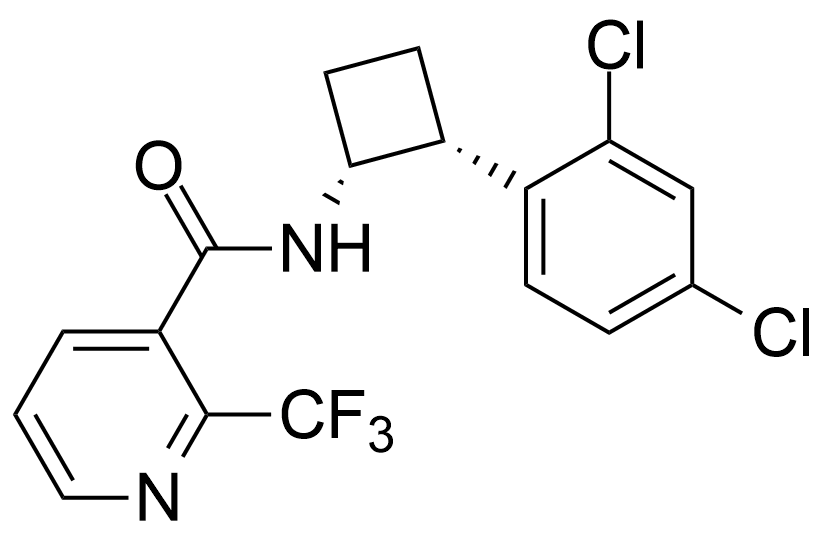
Cyclobutrifluram a Nematicide

A nematicide is a type of chemical pesticide used to kill plant-parasitic nematodes. Nematicides have tended to be broad-spectrum toxicants possessing high volatility or other properties promoting migration through the soil. Aldicarb (Temik), a carbamate insecticide marketed by Bayer CropScience, is an example of a commonly used commercial nematicide. It is important in potato production, where it has been used for control of soil-borne nematodes. Aldicarb is a cholinesterase inhibitor, which prevents the breakdown of acetylcholine in the synapse. In case of severe poisoning, the victim dies of respiratory failure. It is no longer authorised for use in the EU and, in August 2010, Bayer CropScience announced that it planned to discontinue aldicarb by 2014. Human health safety and environmental concerns have resulted in the widespread deregistration of several other agronomically important nematicides. Prior to 1985, the persistent halocarbon DBCP was a widely used nematicide and soil fumigant. However, it was banned from use after being linked to sterility among male workers; the Dow Chemical company was subsequently found liable for more than $600 million in damages.

Several natural nematicides are known. An environmentally benign garlic-derived polysulfide product is approved for use in the European Union (under Annex 1 of 91/414) and the UK as a nematicide. Another common natural nematicide is obtained from neem cake, the residue obtained after cold-pressing the fruit and kernels of the neem tree. Known by several names in the world, the tree was first cultivated in India in ancient times and is now widely distributed throughout the world. The root exudate of marigold (Tagetes) is also found to have nematicidal action. Nematophagous fungi, a type of carnivorous fungi, can be useful in controlling nematodes, Paecilomyces being one example.

Besides chemicals, soil steaming can be used in order to kill nematodes. Superheated steam is induced into the soil, which causes almost all organic material to deteriorate.

== See also ==
- Vermicide
