= Triamiphos =

Names
- Preferred IUPAC name P-(5-Amino-3-phenyl-1H-1,2,4-triazol-1-yl)-N,N,N′,N′-tetramethylphosphonic diamide
- Other names: WP155; Wepsyn

Identifiers
CAS Number	1031-47-6
3D model (JSmol)	Interactive image
ChemSpider	13341
ECHA InfoCard	100.149.164
EC Number	620-368-1
PubChem CID	13943
UNII	9I7U4X189B
CompTox Dashboard (EPA)	DTXSID2042482
- InChI: InChI=1S/C12H19N6OP/c1-16(2)20(19,17(3)4)18-12(13)14-11(15-18)10-8-6-5-7-9-10/h5-9H,1-4H3,(H2,13,14,15) Key: BABJTMNVJXLAEX-UHFFFAOYSA-N; InChI=1/C12H19N6OP/c1-16(2)20(19,17(3)4)18-12(13)14-11(15-18)10-8-6-5-7-9-10/h5-9H,1-4H3,(H2,13,14,15) Key: BABJTMNVJXLAEX-UHFFFAOYAV
- SMILES: O=P(n1nc(nc1N)c2ccccc2)(N(C)C)N(C)C

Properties
Chemical formula	C_{12}H_{19}N_{6}OP
Molar mass	294.299 g·mol^{−1}
Appearance	white powder
Solubility in water	0.25 g/L

Hazards
- GHS labelling
Pictograms	(GHS06: Toxic)
Signal word	Danger
Hazard statements	H300, H310
Precautionary statements	P262, P264, P270, P280, P301+P310, P302+P350, P310, P321, P322, P330, P361, P363, P405, P501
- Except where otherwise noted, data are given for materials in their standard state (at 25 °C [77 °F], 100 kPa). Infobox references

Triamiphos (chemical formula: C_{12}H_{19}N_{6}OP) is an organophosphate used as a pesticide and fungicide. It is used to control powdery mildews on apples and ornamentals. It was discontinued by the US manufacturer in 1998.

== History ==
The phosphoramide Triamiphos is thought to be the first commercially available systemic fungicide. Despite its prominent use in the years following its discovery, no long-term toxicity studies were undertaken until 1974. Further, it has since been replaced by other pesticides. The WHO recommended classification of pesticides by hazard considers triamiphos to be discontinued as use for pesticide.

== Structure and Reactivity ==
It is classified as an organophosphorus compound O=P(R)3 and more specifically as a phosphoramide O=P(NR2)3. The bis(dimethylamido)phosphoryl group (Me2N)2-P(O)- is present in triamiphos and also a number of other fungicides.

It contains two chemical groups used in pesticide synthesis (triazole, phosphoryl). The most relevant distinct subparts of the molecule are the oxon centre (O=P) and the leaving group (the triazole aromatic moiety). Triamiphos technically is not an organophosphate O=P(OR)3, a subclass of organophosphorus O=PR3 compounds. However, the distinction is not always consistent throughout literature where organophosphorus compounds without the alkoxy sidechains or even with a O=S group instead of a O=P group are still classified as organophosphate pesticides (OPs).

Schradan, another organophosphorus pesticide, can be seen as analogous to triamiphos, differing only in the leaving group. As both have comparable toxic properties, it can be concluded that the phenylaminotriazole moiety of triamiphos does not appear to be vital for its anticholinesterase property.

== Synthesis ==
Triamiphos was first synthesised by Van den Bos et al. (1960) by adding the salt of 3-amino-5-phenyl-1,2,4-triazole to a solution of phosphoryl chloride. Subsequently, gaseous dimethylamine is introduced into the reaction mixture to yield triamiphos.

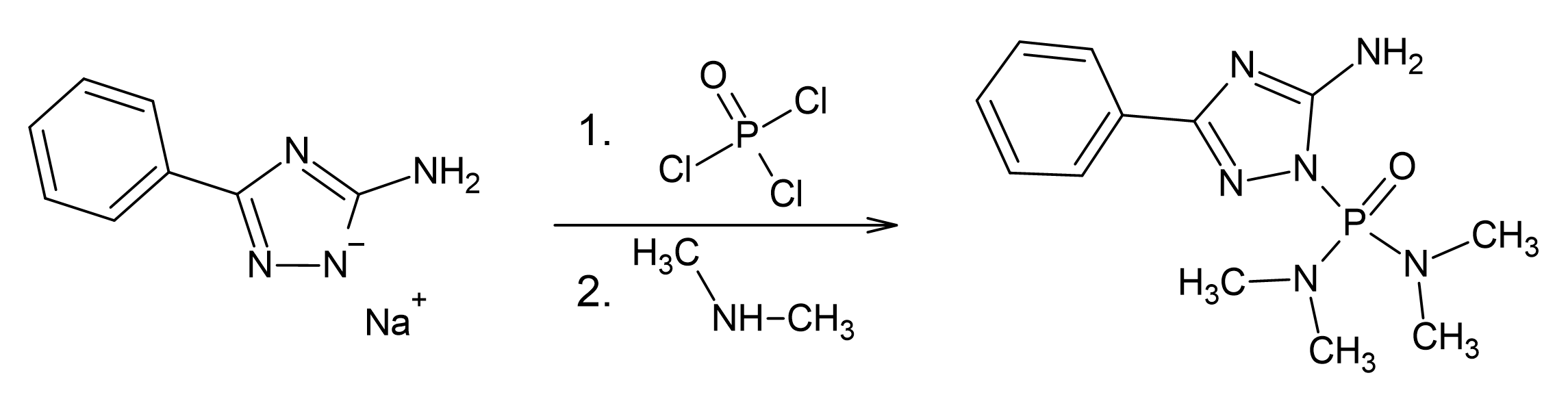

== Biotransformation ==
There were no studies on the exact determination of the biotransformation route and the active metabolite's structure of Triamiphos.

== Mechanism of Action and Toxicity in Animal Studies ==
The toxic effect of Triamiphos ties back to the acetylcholinesterase inhibition ability of its active metabolite. This inhibitory effect is observed for absorption routes through the skin, respiratory or digestive tract.

The National Institute of Public Health in The Netherlands reported a dose-dependent effect of Triamiphos from a short-term study in rats. They found inhibition of acetylcholinesterase activity at a concentration of 1 ppm during the feeding period. After a recovery period the enzyme activity returned to normal. A long-term feeding and a three-generation reproduction study performed by Verschuuren et al. (1974), however, found inhibitory effects at an even lower concentration of 0.5 ppm. At this concentration, cholinesterase activity was inhibited in the P-, but not in the F1, F2 or F3 generations. Inhibition in all generations was observed at a concentration of 2.5 ppm, in which the subsequent generations were already exposed to the toxicant from the moment of conception.

A no-effect level of 0.1 ppm was reported by both studies.

Furthermore, a greater inhibitory effect on erythrocyte cholinesterase compared to plasma or brain cholinesterase activity was reported. Therefore, the active metabolite does not appear to readily enter the brain and primarily muscarinic and nicotinic effects are observed. The LD50 (i.p. route) was determined to be between 15 and 18 mg/kg in rats and 10–30 mg/kg in mice. Animals receiving the lethal dose were reported to be maintained upon administration of atropine as antidote. An important factor responsible for the acute toxicity of Triamiphos is the rate of cholinesterase inhibition: if the activity is reduced by 70% within a few minutes, death primarily due to paralysis of the respiratory muscles in rats was reported. The inhibited enzyme is not reactivated and the above-mentioned recovery of the animals was only possible due to its resynthesis. A 1976-study suggested an increased cholesterol content in rat aorta and changes in lipid metabolism as further effects of Triamiphos, which could however not be confirmed by another, more elaborate study. An overview of the effects of Triamiphos at different concentrations can be found in the table below.

Effects of Triamiphos at different concentrations
Dose	Effect
0.1 ppm	NOAEL (no-effect level)
0.5 ppm	Inhibitory effects in P-generation
2.5 ppm	Inhibitory effects in P- and subsequent generations
15–18 mg/kg	Oral LD50 in rats
10–30 mg/kg	Oral LD50 in mice

== Indications ==
Triamiphos is suspected to exert the same toxic side effects to humans as other organophosphorus pesticides, though no human data on specifically Triamiphos exposure seems to be available.
