= Morpholine =

numbered skeletal formula of the morpholine molecule
perspective skeletal formula of the morpholine molecule
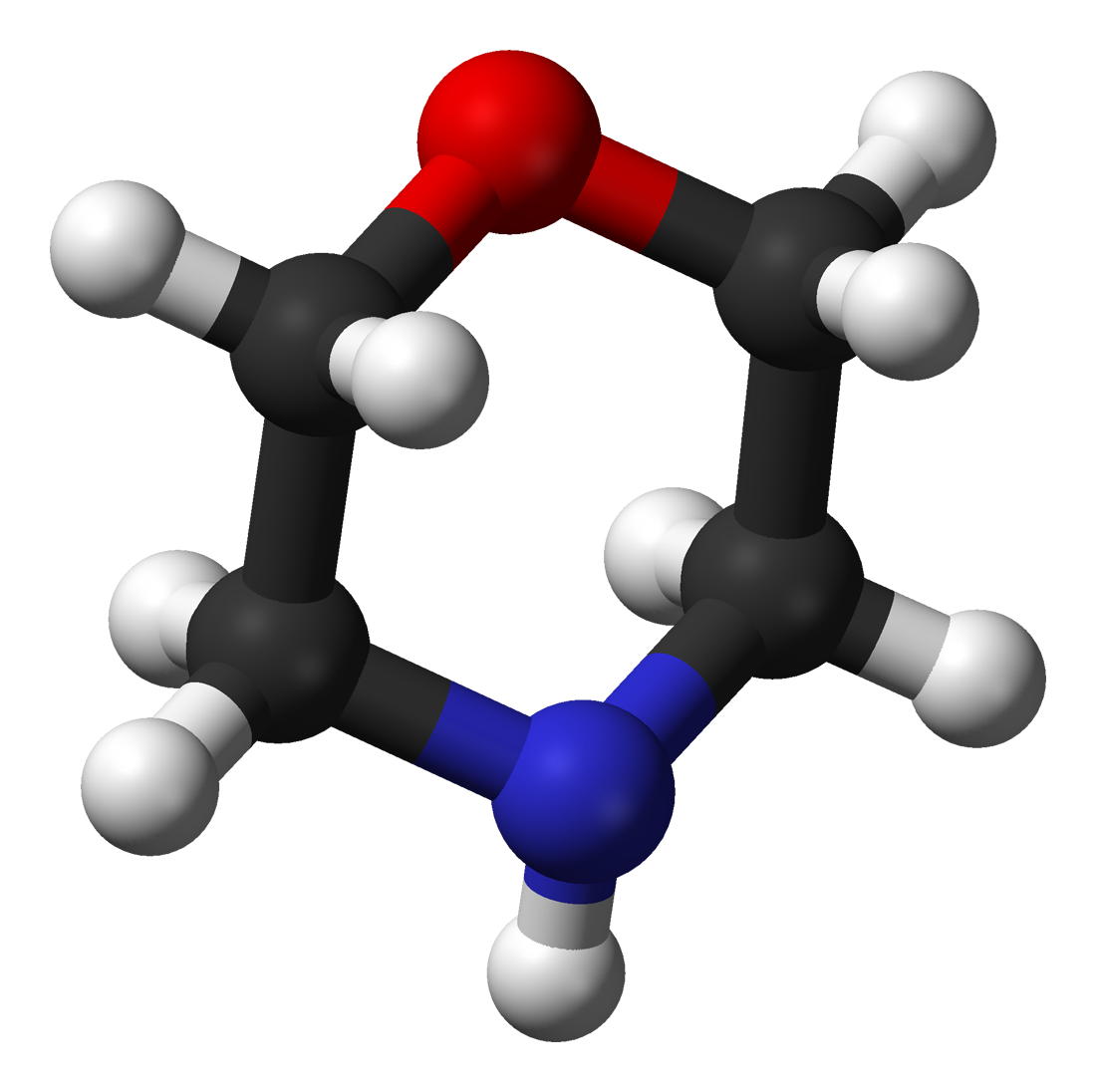
ball-and-stick model of the morpholine molecule
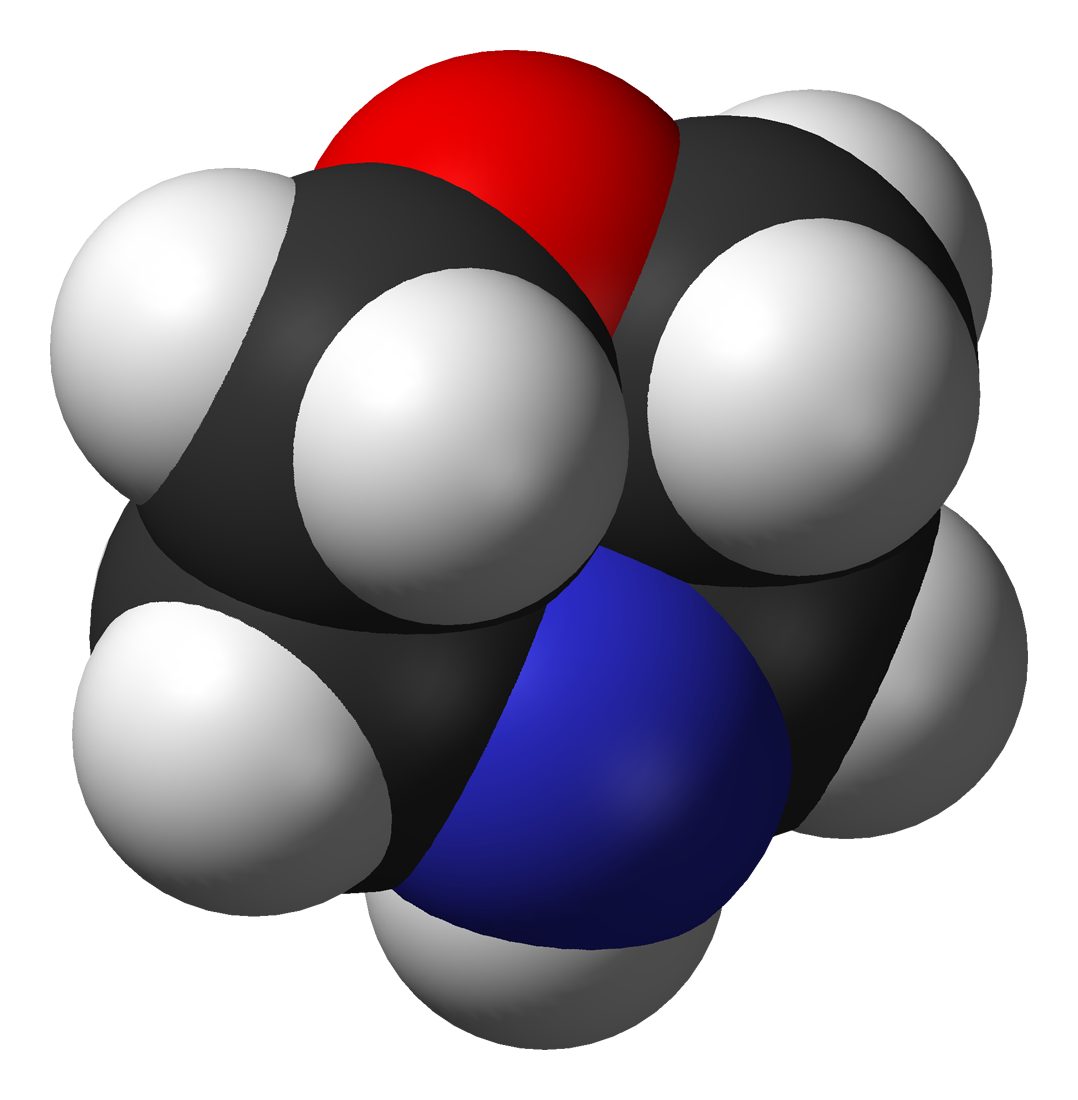
space-filling model of the morpholine molecule

Names
- Preferred IUPAC name Morpholine
- Other names Diethylenimide oxide 1,4-Oxazinane; Tetrahydro-1,4-oxazine; Diethylene imidoxide Diethylene oximide Tetrahydro-p-oxazine

Identifiers
CAS Number	110-91-8
3D model (JSmol)	Interactive image
Beilstein Reference	102549
ChEBI	CHEBI:34856
ChEMBL	ChEMBL276518
ChemSpider	13837537
ECHA InfoCard	100.003.469
EC Number	203-815-1
Gmelin Reference	1803
KEGG	C14452
PubChem CID	8083
RTECS number	QD6475000
UNII	8B2ZCK305O
UN number	2054
CompTox Dashboard (EPA)	DTXSID2025688
- InChI: InChI=1S/C4H9NO/c1-3-6-4-2-5-1/h5H,1-4H2 Key: YNAVUWVOSKDBBP-UHFFFAOYSA-N; InChI=1/C4H9NO/c1-3-6-4-2-5-1/h5H,1-4H2 Key: YNAVUWVOSKDBBP-UHFFFAOYAU
- SMILES: C1CNCCO1

Properties
Chemical formula	C_{4}H_{9}NO
Molar mass	87.122 g·mol^{−1}
Appearance	Colorless liquid
Odor	Weak ammonia-like or fish-like
Density	1.007 g/cm^{3}
Melting point	−5 °C (23 °F; 268 K)
Boiling point	129 °C (264 °F; 402 K)
Solubility in water	miscible
Vapor pressure	6 mmHg (20 °C)
Acidity (pK_{a})	8.36 (of conjugate acid)
Magnetic susceptibility (χ)	−55.0·10^{−6} cm^{3}/mol

Hazards
- Occupational safety and health (OHS/OSH)
Main hazards	Flammable, Corrosive
- GHS labelling
Pictograms	(GHS02: Flammable) (GHS05: Corrosive) (GHS07: Exclamation mark)
Signal word	Danger
Hazard statements	H226, H302, H312, H314, H332
Precautionary statements	P210, P233, P240, P241, P242, P243, P260, P264, P270, P271, P280, P301+P312, P301+P330+P331, P302+P352, P303+P361+P353, P304+P312, P304+P340, P305+P351+P338, P310, P312, P321, P322, P330, P363, P370+P378, P403+P235, P405, P501
NFPA 704 (fire diamond)	3 3 0
Flash point	31 °C (88 °F; 304 K)
Autoignition temperature	275 °C (527 °F; 548 K)
Explosive limits	1.4%–11.2%
- Lethal dose or concentration (LD, LC)
LD_{50} (median dose)	1220 mg/kg (mammal, oral); 525 mg/kg (mouse, oral); 1050 mg/kg (rat, oral)
LC_{50} (median concentration)	365 ppm (mouse, 2 hr)
- NIOSH (US health exposure limits)
PEL (Permissible)	TWA 20 ppm (70 mg/m^{3}) [skin]
REL (Recommended)	TWA 20 ppm (70 mg/m^{3}) ST 30 ppm (105 mg/m^{3}) [skin]
IDLH (Immediate danger)	1400 ppm
Safety data sheet (SDS)	hazard.com
- Except where otherwise noted, data are given for materials in their standard state (at 25 °C [77 °F], 100 kPa). verify (what is ?) Infobox references

Morpholine is an organic chemical compound having the chemical formula O(CH_{2}CH_{2})_{2}NH. This heterocycle features both amine and ether functional groups. Because of the amine, morpholine is a base; its conjugate acid is called morpholinium. For example, treating morpholine with hydrochloric acid generates the salt morpholinium chloride. It is a colorless liquid with a weak, ammonia- or fish-like odor. The naming of morpholine is attributed to Ludwig Knorr, who incorrectly believed it to be part of the structure of morphine.

== Production ==
Morpholine is often produced industrially by the dehydration of diethanolamine with concentrated sulfuric acid. Alternatively, it can be made from bis(2-chloroethyl)ether in a reaction with ammonia, by which also ammonium chloride is formed.

Morpholine is also produced industrially from diethylene glycol and ammonia, under high temperature and pressure, in the presence of hydrogen and a suitable catalyst.

== Uses ==
=== Industrial applications ===
Morpholine is a common additive, in parts per million concentrations, for pH adjustment in both fossil fuel and nuclear power plant steam systems. Morpholine is used because its volatility is about the same as water, so once it is added to the water, its concentration becomes distributed rather evenly in both the water and steam phases. Its pH-adjusting qualities then become distributed throughout the steam plant to provide corrosion protection. Morpholine is often used in conjunction with low concentrations of hydrazine or ammonia to provide a comprehensive all-volatile treatment chemistry for corrosion protection for the steam systems of such plants. Morpholine decomposes reasonably slowly in the absence of oxygen at the high temperatures and pressures in these steam systems.

=== Organic synthesis ===
Morpholine undergoes most chemical reactions typical for other secondary amines, though the presence of the ether oxygen withdraws electron density from the nitrogen, rendering it less nucleophilic (and less basic) than structurally similar secondary amines such as piperidine. For this reason, it forms a stable chloramine.

It is commonly used to generate enamines.

Morpholine is widely used in organic synthesis. For example, it is a building block in the preparation of the antibiotic linezolid, the anticancer agent gefitinib (brand name Iressa) and the analgesic dextromoramide.

In research and in industry, the low cost and polarity of morpholine lead to its common use as a solvent for chemical reactions.

=== Agriculture ===
==== As a fruit coating ====
In nature, fruits make waxes to protect against insects and fungal contamination, but this can be lost as the fruit is cleaned. Hence a small amount of new wax, made from shellac, is applied to replace it. Morpholine is sometimes used as an emulsifier and solubility aid for this new coating. The European Union has forbidden the use of morpholine in fruit coating.

==== As a component in fungicides ====
Morpholine derivatives used as agricultural fungicides in cereals are known as ergosterol biosynthesis inhibitors.

- Amorolfine
- Fenpropimorph
- Tridemorph

== See also ==
- Morpholino
- Piperidine
