= 2-Methyleneglutaronitrile =

Names
- Preferred IUPAC name 2-Methylidenepentanedinitrile
- Other names 2,4-dicyano-1-butene 2-Methylenepentanedinitrile

Identifiers
| CAS Number | 1572-52-7 |
| 3D model (JSmol) | Interactive image |
| ChEMBL | ChEMBL3182918 |
| ChemSpider | 66697 |
| ECHA InfoCard | 100.014.902 |
| EC Number | 216-391-8 |
| PubChem CID | 74080 |
| UNII | 0Y85F7Y2B8 |
| CompTox Dashboard (EPA) | DTXSID2027418 |
- InChI: InChI=1S/C6H6N2/c1-6(5-8)3-2-4-7/h1-3H2 Key: NGCJVMZXRCLPRQ-UHFFFAOYSA-N
- SMILES: C=C(CCC#N)C#N

Properties
| Chemical formula | C_{6}H_{6}N_{2} |
| Molar mass | 106.13 g·mol^{−1} |
| Appearance | clear, colourless liquid |
| Density | 0.976 g·cm^{−3} (25 °C) |

Hazards
- GHS labelling
| Pictograms | (GHS07: Exclamation mark) |
| Signal word | Warning |
| Hazard statements | H302, H312, H332 |
| Precautionary statements | P261, P264, P270, P271, P280, P301+P312, P302+P352, P304+P312, P304+P340, P312, P322, P330, P363, P501 |
- Except where otherwise noted, data are given for materials in their standard state (at 25 °C [77 °F], 100 kPa). Infobox references

2-Methylene glutaronitrile is a dimerization product of acrylonitrile and a starting material for di- and triamines, for the biocide 2-bromo-2-(bromomethyl)pentanedinitrile and for heterocycles, such as 3-cyanopyridine.

== Preparation ==
2-Methylene glutaronitrile is a side-product in the production of hexanedinitrile which is used (after hydrogenation to 1,6-diaminohexane) as a key component for engineering polymers such as the polyamides (PA 66) or polyurethanes. Hexanedinitrile can be industrially produced by electrochemical hydrodimerisation or by catalytic dimerization of acrylonitrile.

A catalytic tail-tail dimerization of two acrylonitrile molecules forms hexanedinitrile:

Hydrodimerisierung von Acrylnitril zu Adiponitril

Also head-to-tail dimerization can occur in the process. In the presence of tricyclohexylphosphine (PCy3) a yield of up to 77% 2-methylene glutaronitrile can be obtained:

Dimerisierung von Acrylnitril zu 2-Methylenglutaronitril

Metal halides (such as zinc chloride or aluminium chloride) are used with tertiary amines (such as triethylamine) as catalysts for the dimerization. Crude yields of up to 84% are achieved. Often, significant amounts of product are lost during the work-up (e. g. extraction and distillation) because of the tendency to polymerization of 2-methylene glutaronitrile.

In addition to the linear dimerization products 1,4-dicyano-2-butene and 1,4-dicyano-3-butene (obtained as cis-trans isomer mixtures) usually also other oligomers (and polymers) of acrylonitrile are formed. During the electrochemical hydrooligomerization of acrylonitrile, these are trimers, such as 1,3,6- and 1,3,5-tricyanohexane or tetramers, such as 1,3,6,8- and 1,3,5,8-tetracyanooctane. The reaction of acrylonitrile with tributylphosphine affords 2-methyleneglutaronitrile in a modest yield of about 10% after fractional distillation. The DABCO-catalyzed acrylonitrile dimerization of 2,4-dicyano-1-butene after 10 days at room temperature is with 40% yield similarly inefficient.

== Use ==
The earlier patent literature describes processes for the isomerization of 2-methylene glutaronitrile to 1,4-dicyanobutenes as hexanedinitrile precursors, which became obsolete with the optimization of the electrochemical hydrodimerization of acrylonitrile to hexanedinitrile.

The electrochemical hydrodimerization of 2-methylene glutaronitrile produces 1,3,6,8-tetracyanooctane.

Hydrodimerisierung von 2-Methylenglutaronitril

In the hydrogenation of 2-methylene glutaronitrile in the presence of palladium on carbon, hydrogen is attached to the double bond and 2-methylglutaronitrile is obtained in virtually quantitative yield.

The hydrogenation of the nitrile groups requires more severe conditions and the presence of ammonia or amines to suppress the formation of secondary amines. This second hydrogenation step is carried out with Raney-cobalt as the hydrogenation catalyst to give 2-methyl-1,5-pentanediamine in 80% yield.

Hydrierung von 2-Methylenglutaronitril zu 2-Methyl-1,5-pentandiamin

Hydrogenation of 2-methylene glutaronitrile in the presence of ammonia with manganese-containing sodium oxide-doped cobalt catalyst (at 80 to 100 °C and pressures of 200 atm in a tubular reactor) leads to the addition of ammonia to the double bond and directly converts the compound to 2-aminomethyl-1,5-pentanediamine with yields of 66%.

Bildung von 2-Aminomethyl-1,5-pentandiamin

The branched triamine can be used in epoxides and polyurethanes.

2-Methylenglutaronitrile reacts with methanamide upon catalysis with 4-(dimethylamino)-pyridine (DMAP) at 60 °C in 47% yield to give 1-(N-methanoylamino)-2,4-dicyanobutane, from which α- aminomethylglutaric acid is formed by subsequent hydrolysis.

Reaktion von 2-Methylenglutaronitril mit Formamid zu 1-(N-Formylamino)-2,4-dicyanobutan

Heating 2-methyleneglutaronitrile with an alkaline ion exchanger, pyridine and water to 150 °C in an autoclave yields the lactam 5-cyano-2-piperidone in 80% yield.

Lactambildung zum 5-Cyano-2-piperidon

2-Methylene glutaronitrile can be polymerized to various homo- and copolymers via anionic polymerization with sodium cyanide, sodium in liquid ammonia or with butyllithium. However, the polymers are formed only in low yields and show unsatisfactory properties such as intrinsic viscosities and poor mechanical properties.

The main use of 2-methyleneglutaronitrile is as starting material for the broad-spectrum biocide 2-bromo-2-(bromomethyl)pentanedinitrile (methyldibromo-glutaronitrile), which is formed in virtually quantitative yield by the addition of bromine to the double bond.

Bromierung von 2-Methylenglutaronitril

From the chlorine-analogous 2-chloro-2-(chloromethyl)pentenenitrile, 3-cyanopyridine is obtained by heating to 150 °C with tin(IV)chloride.

Bildung von 3-Cyanpyridin aus 2-Methylenglutaronitril
