= Fenpicoxamid =

Names
- IUPAC name [2-[[(3S,7R,8R,9S)-7-Benzyl-9-methyl-8-(2-methylpropanoyloxy)-2,6-dioxo-1,5-dioxonan-3-yl]carbamoyl]-4-methoxypyridin-3-yl]oxymethyl 2-methylpropanoate

Identifiers
CAS Number	517875-34-2
3D model (JSmol)	Interactive image
ChEBI	CHEBI:136340
ChemSpider	57630848
ECHA InfoCard	100.248.997
EC Number	815-084-1
PubChem CID	51039126
UNII	8W7MC999JJ
CompTox Dashboard (EPA)	DTXSID80895118
- InChI: InChI=1S/C31H38N2O11/c1-17(2)28(35)42-16-41-26-23(39-6)12-13-32-24(26)27(34)33-22-15-40-30(37)21(14-20-10-8-7-9-11-20)25(19(5)43-31(22)38)44-29(36)18(3)4/h7-13,17-19,21-22,25H,14-16H2,1-6H3,(H,33,34)/t19-,21+,22-,25-/m0/s1 Key: QGTOTYJSCYHYFK-RBODFLQRSA-N
- SMILES: C[C@H]1[C@@H]([C@H](C(=O)OC[C@@H](C(=O)O1)NC(=O)C2=NC=CC(=C2OCOC(=O)C(C)C)OC)CC3=CC=CC=C3)OC(=O)C(C)C

Properties
Chemical formula	C_{31}H_{38}N_{2}O_{11}
Molar mass	614.648 g·mol^{−1}

Hazards
- GHS labelling
Pictograms	(GHS08: Health hazard) (GHS09: Environmental hazard)
Signal word	Warning
Hazard statements	H373, H410
Precautionary statements	P260, P273, P319, P391, P501
- Except where otherwise noted, data are given for materials in their standard state (at 25 °C [77 °F], 100 kPa). Infobox references

Fenpicoxamid is a picolinamide fungicide used to control fungal pathogens in cereal crops, particularly Zymoseptoria tritici in wheat. It is derived from a naturally occurring substance called UK-2A produced by a Streptomyces bacteria and is structurally related to the piscicide antimycin A. When absorbed by fungi or plants it is converted to UK-2A. It was authorised for use in the United Kingdom in 2021 and by 2022 was used on 670,000 hectares.
