= Patch test =

Medical test to determine substances causing allergic reactions

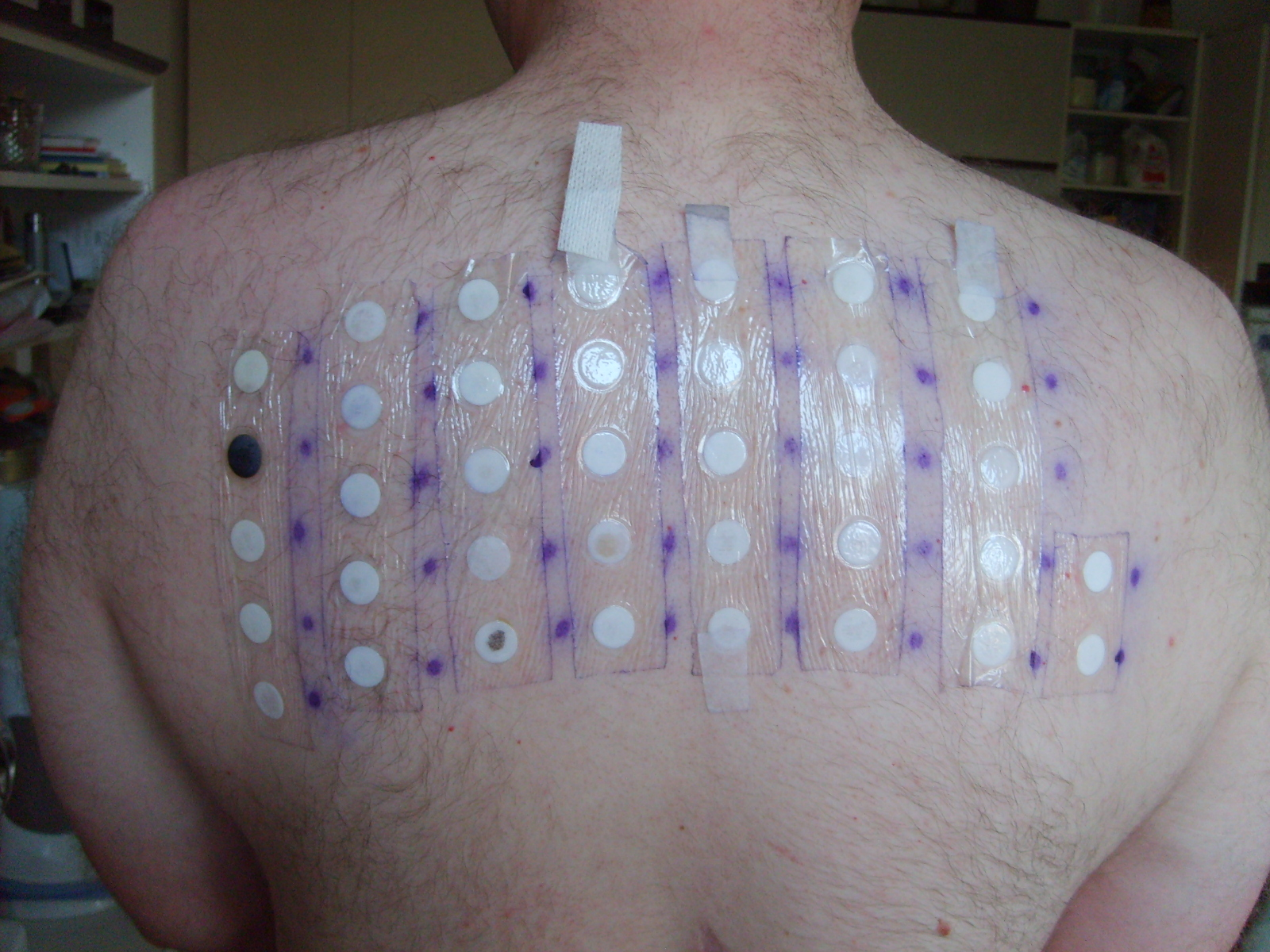
- Patch test
- Specialty: Immunology, dermatology
- MeSH: D010328

A patch test is a diagnostic method used to determine which specific substances cause allergic inflammation of a patient's skin.

Patch testing helps identify which substances may be causing a delayed-type allergic reaction in a patient and may identify allergens not identified by blood testing or skin prick testing. It is intended to produce a local allergic reaction on a small area of the patient's back, where the diluted chemicals were planted.

The chemicals included in the patch test kit are the offenders in approximately 85–90 percent of contact allergic eczema and include chemicals present in metals (e.g., nickel), rubber, leather, formaldehyde, lanolin, fragrance, toiletries, hair dyes, medicine, pharmaceutical items, food, drink, preservative, and other additives.

== Mechanism ==
A patch test relies on the principle of a type IV hypersensitivity reaction.

The first step in becoming allergic is sensitization. When skin is exposed to an allergen, the antigen-presenting cells (APCs) – also known as Langerhans cell or Dermal Dendritic Cell – phagocytize the substance, break it down to smaller components and present them on their surface bound major histocompatibility complex type two (MHC-II) molecules. The APC then travels to a lymph node, where it presents the displayed allergen to a CD4+ T-cell, or T-helper cell. The T-cell undergoes clonal expansion and some clones of the newly formed antigen specific sensitized T-cells travel back to the site of antigen exposure.

When the skin is again exposed to the antigen, the memory t-cells in the skin recognize the antigen and produce cytokines (chemical signals), which cause more T-cells to migrate from blood vessels. This starts a complex immune cascade leading to skin inflammation, itching, and the typical rash of contact dermatitis. In general, it takes 2–4 days for a response in patch testing to develop. The patch test is just induction of contact dermatitis in a small area.

== Process ==
Application of the patch tests takes about half an hour, though many times the overall appointment time is longer as the provider will take an extensive history. Tiny quantities of 25 to ~150 materials (allergens) in individual square plastic or round aluminium chambers are applied to the upper back. They are kept in place with special hypoallergenic adhesive tape. The patches stay in place undisturbed for at least 48 hours. Vigorous exercise or stretching may disrupt the test. At the second appointment, usually, 48 hours later, the patches are removed. Sometimes additional patches are applied. The back is marked with an indelible black felt tip pen or another suitable marker to identify the test sites, and a preliminary reading is done. These marks must be visible at the third appointment, usually 24–48 hours later (72–96 hours after application). In some cases, reading at 7 days may be requested, especially if a special metal series is tested.PMID 26179009

Patch Testing for cosmetic and skincare products can be broken down into a variety of different categories, including the following:

- Human Repeat Insult Patch Testing (Sensitization and Primary Irritation)
- 24, 48, 72 Hour Patch Testing
- Cumulative Irritation Testing
- Repeat Open Application Testing

== Interpretation of results ==
The dermatologist or allergist will read the results on Day 2 (48 hours) and Day 3 (72 hours). If the initial results are negative, another reading is made at Day 7 (168 hours). The result for each test site is recorded as per the International Contact Dermatitis Research Group Criteria: No reaction (0), doubtful reaction (?), weak positive (1+), strong positive (2+), extreme positive (3+), irritant reaction (IR), and not tested (NT).

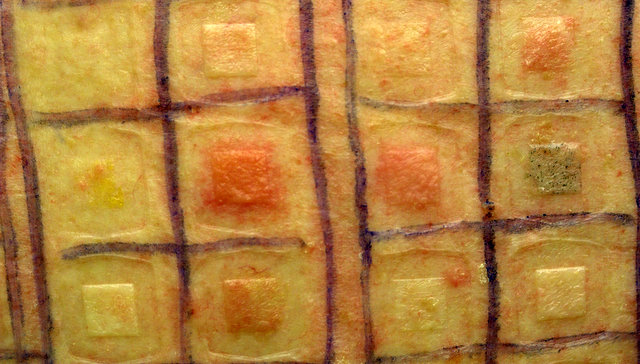
Strong positive

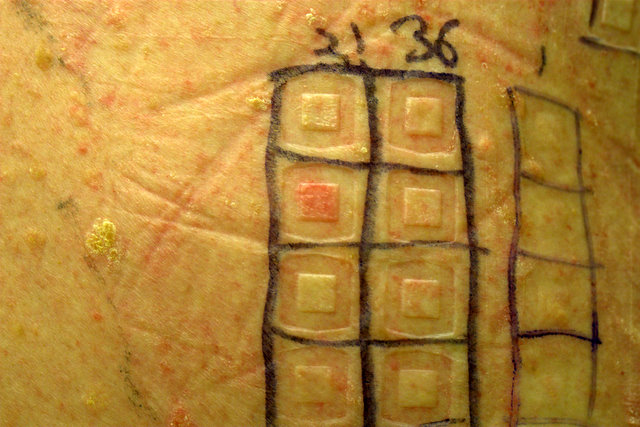
Weak positive

Doubtful reactions are associated with faint erythema. Weak positives are associated with palpable erythema, infiltration, and papules. Strong positives are more severe than weak positives and show the presence of vesicles. Extreme positives are more intense than strong positives and show coalescing vesciles.

The patch test has a poor sensitivity ranging between 11-38%, meaning that false negative reactions are common with the patch test. False positive reactions can also occur as a result of irritant reactions. If the patch test yields a false negative result, then skin prick or intradermal testing may be recommended.

== Common allergens ==
The top allergens from 2005–06 were: nickel sulfate (19.0%), Myroxylon pereirae (Balsam of Peru, 11.9%), fragrance mix I (11.5%), quaternium-15 (10.3%), neomycin (10.0%), bacitracin (9.2%), formaldehyde (9.0%), cobalt chloride (8.4%), methyldibromoglutaronitrile/phenoxyethanol (5.8%), p-phenylenediamine (5.0%), potassium dichromate (4.8%), carba mix (3.9%), thiuram mix (3.9%), diazolidinyl urea (3.7%), and 2-bromo-2-nitropropane-1,3-diol (3.4%).

The most frequent allergen recorded in many research studies around the world is nickel. Nickel allergy is more prevalent in young women and is especially associated with ear piercing or any nickel-containing watch, belt, zipper, or jewelry. Other common allergens are surveyed in North America by the North American Contact Dermatitis Group (NACDG).

== Food allergy ==
Dermatologists may refer a patient with a suspected food allergy for patch testing. Foods identified by blood testing or skin prick testing may or may not overlap with foods identified by patch testing.

Certain food additives and flavorings can cause allergic reactions around and in the mouth, around the anus and vulva as food allergens pass out of the body, or cause a widespread rash on the skin. Allergens such as nickel, balsam of Peru, parabens, sodium benzoate, or cinnamaldehyde may worsen or cause skin rashes.

Foods that cause urticaria (hives) or anaphylaxis (such as peanuts) cause a type I hypersensitivity reaction whereby the part of the food molecule is directly recognized by cells close to the skin, called mast cells. Mast cells have antibodies on their surface called immunoglobulin E (IgE). These act as receptors, and if they recognize the allergen, they release their contents, causing an immediate allergic reaction. Type I reactions like anaphylaxis are immediate and do not take 2 to 4 days to appear.

In a study of patients with chronic hives who were patch tested, those who were found allergic and avoided all contact with their allergen, including dietary intake, stopped having hives. Those who started eating their allergen again had recurrence of their hives.

== See also ==
- Skin allergy test
