= Triazolium salt =

Class of chemical compounds

Triazolium salts

Two isomeric groups of triazolium salts based on different central triazole rings

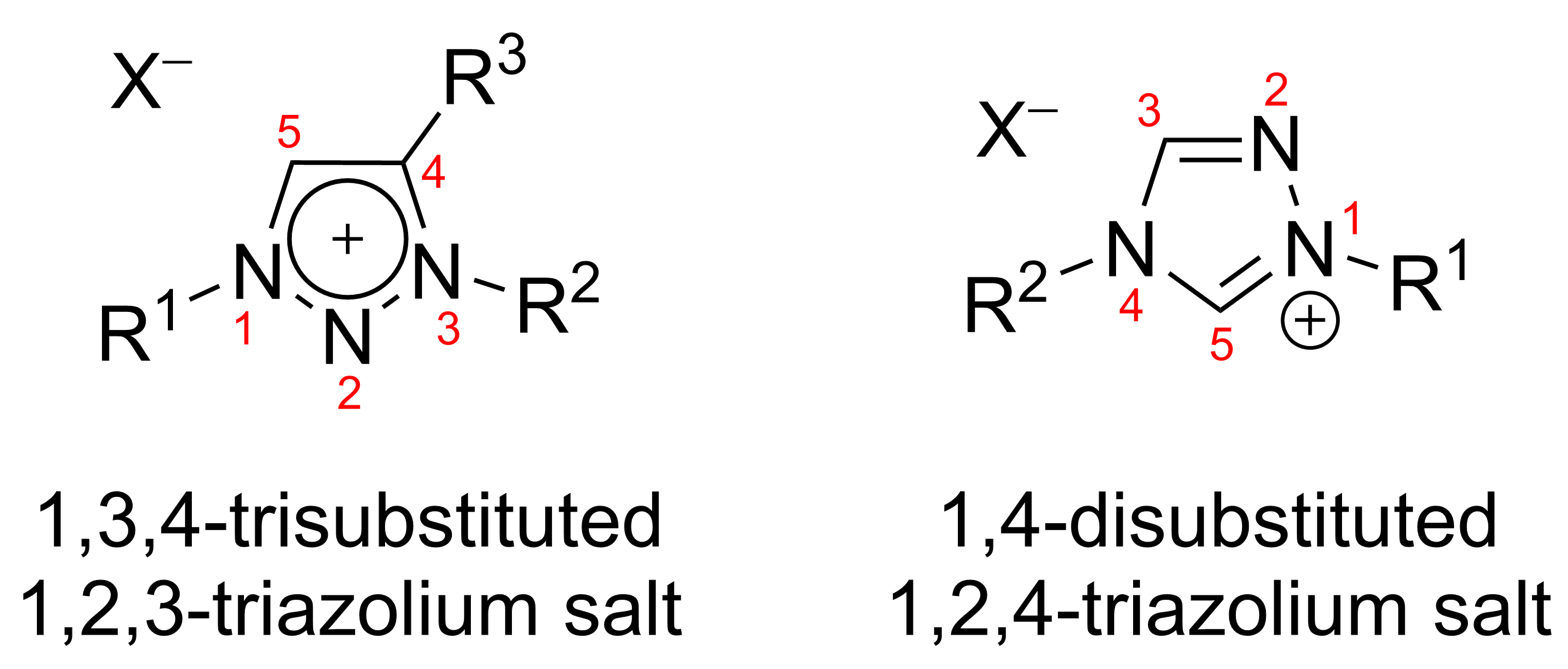

Triazolium salts are chemical compounds based on the substituted triazole structural element. They are composed of a cation based on a heterocyclic five-membered ring with three nitrogen atoms, two of which are functionalized and a corresponding counterion (anion). Depending on the arrangement of the three nitrogen atoms the triazolium salts are divided into two isomers, namely 1,3,4-trisubstituted-1,2,3-triazolium salts as well as 1,2,4-triazolium salts. They are precursors for the preparation of N-heterocyclic carbenes.

== 1,3,4-trisubstituted-1,2,3-triazolium salts ==
1,3,4-trisubstituted-1,2,3-triazolium salts can be synthesized from 3,4-disubstituted-1,2,4-triazol molecule by quaternization of the 1 nitrogen. This quaternization can be done by reaction with alkyl iodides (or other alkyl halide, albeit less yield is generally observed due to less reactivity, alkyl fluoride are rarely seen as they are mostly unreactive) yielding the corresponding 1,3,4-trisubstituted 1,2,3-triazolium salt with iodine. Similarly 1,3,5-trisubstituted-1,2,3-triazolium salts can be obtained from 3,5-disubstituted-1,2,4-triazol.

== 1,4-disubstituted 1,2,4-triazolium salts ==
1,4-disubstituted 1,2,4-triaolium salts can be synthesized from 4-substituted 1,2,4-triazol molecule by quaternization of the 1 nitrogen. This quaternization can be done by reaction with alkyl iodides (or other alkyl halide, albeit less yield is generally observed due to less reactivity, alkyl fluoride are rarely seen as they are mostly unreactive) yielding the corresponding 1,4-disubstituted 1,2,4-triazolium salt with iodine.
