= Penflufen =

Fungicide

Names
- IUPAC name 5-Fluoro-1,3-dimethyl-N-[2-(4-methylpentan-2-yl)phenyl]pyrazole-4-carboxamide

Identifiers
CAS Number	494793-67-8
3D model (JSmol)	Interactive image
ChemSpider	9848842
ECHA InfoCard	100.113.711
PubChem CID	11674113
UNII	8252E275KT
CompTox Dashboard (EPA)	DTXSID9058107
- InChI: InChI=1S/C18H24FN3O/c1-11(2)10-12(3)14-8-6-7-9-15(14)20-18(23)16-13(4)21-22(5)17(16)19/h6-9,11-12H,10H2,1-5H3,(H,20,23) Key: GOFJDXZZHFNFLV-UHFFFAOYSA-N
- SMILES: CC1=NN(C(=C1C(=O)NC2=CC=CC=C2C(C)CC(C)C)F)C

Properties
Chemical formula	C_{18}H_{24}FN_{3}O
Molar mass	317.408 g·mol^{−1}
- Except where otherwise noted, data are given for materials in their standard state (at 25 °C [77 °F], 100 kPa). Infobox references

Penflufen is a fungicide which was produced and patented by Bayer AG in 2006 and is used for crop protection from fungi. Penflufen is a pyrazole-amide based succinate-dehydrogenase inhibitor, which blocks the electron transport at complex II in the mitochondrial respiration chain. The European Chemical Agency (ECHA) has also approved the use of penflufen in wood preservation despite labelling it a suspected carcinogen.
