= Amorolfine =

Chemical compound

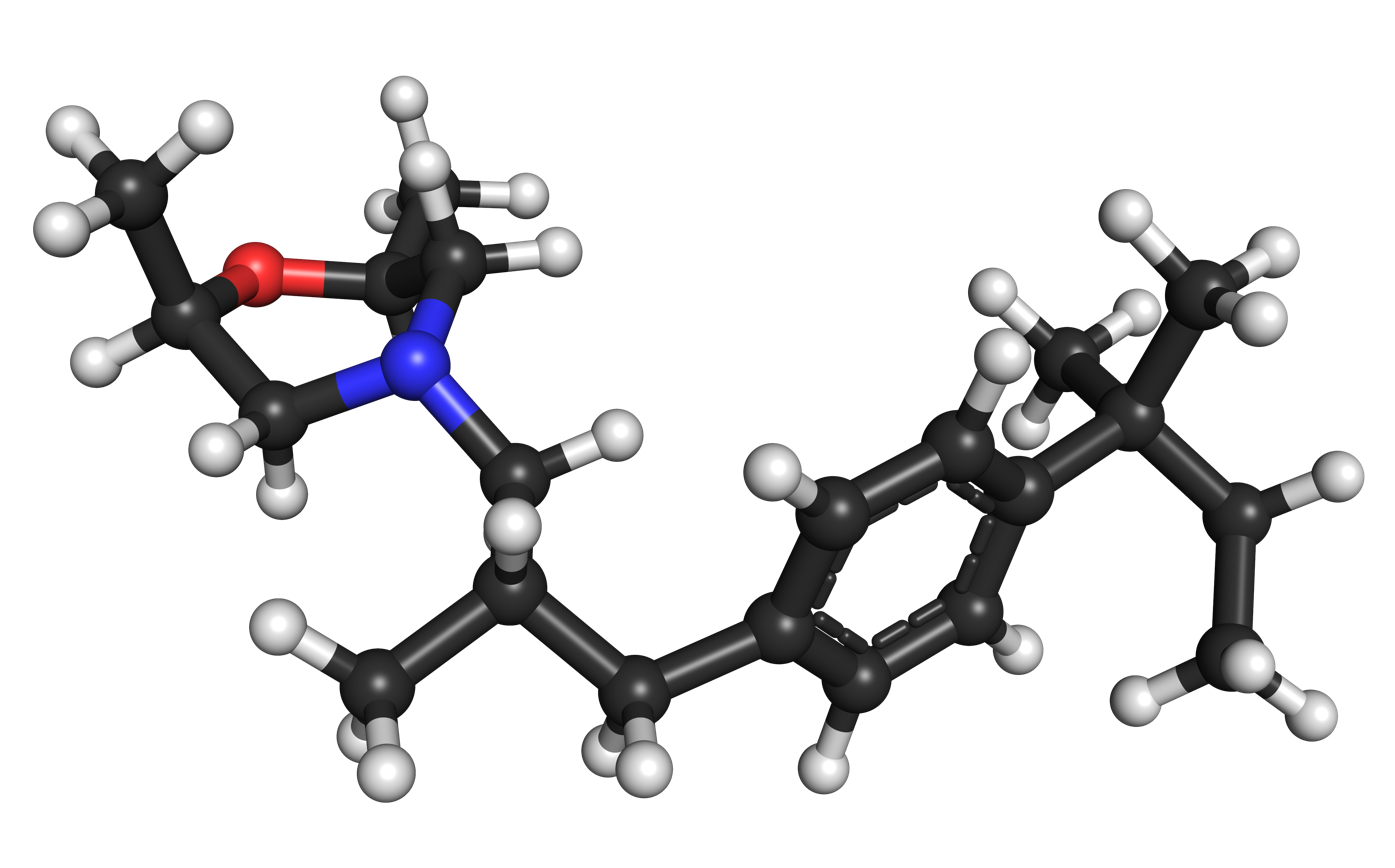
- Above: molecular structure of amorolfine Below: 3D representation of an amorolfine molecule

Clinical data
- Trade names: Loceryl, others
- AHFS/Drugs.com: International Drug Names
- ATC code: D01AE16 (WHO)

Legal status
- Legal status: AU: S4 (Prescription only) / Schedule 2

Identifiers
- IUPAC name: (±)-(2R,6S)-rel-2,6-Dimethyl-4-{2-methyl-3-[4-(2-methylbutan-2-yl)phenyl]propyl}morpholine
- CAS Number: 78613-35-1
- PubChem CID: 54260
- ChemSpider: 49010
- UNII: AB0BHP2FH0
- KEGG: D02923
- ChEBI: CHEBI:599440
- ChEMBL: ChEMBL489411
- CompTox Dashboard (EPA): DTXSID0046690

Chemical and physical data
- Formula: C_{21}H_{35}NO
- Molar mass: 317.517 g·mol^{−1}
- 3D model (JSmol): Interactive image
- SMILES: O2[C@@H](CN(CC(C)Cc1ccc(cc1)C(C)(C)CC)C[C@@H]2C)C
- InChI: InChI=1S/C21H35NO/c1-7-21(5,6)20-10-8-19(9-11-20)12-16(2)13-22-14-17(3)23-18(4)15-22/h8-11,16-18H,7,12-15H2,1-6H3/t16?,17-,18+; Key:MQHLMHIZUIDKOO-AYHJJNSGSA-N

Amorolfine (or amorolfin), is a morpholine antifungal drug that inhibits Δ^{14}-sterol reductase and cholestenol Δ-isomerase, which depletes ergosterol and causes ignosterol to accumulate in the fungal cytoplasmic cell membranes. Sold under the brand name Loceryl among others, amorolfine is commonly available in the form of a nail lacquer, containing 5% amorolfine hydrochloride as the active ingredient. It is used to treat onychomycosis (fungal infection of the toe- and fingernails). Amorolfine 5% nail lacquer in once-weekly or twice-weekly applications was shown in two decades-old studies to be between 60% and 71% effective in treating toenail onychomycosis; complete cure rates three months after stopping treatment (after six months of treatment) were 38% and 46%. However, full experimental details of these trials were not available, and since they were first reported in 1992 there have been no subsequent trials.

It is a topical solution for the treatment of toenail infections. Systemic treatments may be considered more effective.

It is approved for sale over-the-counter in Australia, Brazil, Russia, Germany, and the UK.
