= Bromoaniline =

Group of isomers involving bromine

The bromoanilines form a group of three isomers where the bromine atom occupies the para, ortho or meta position on the aromatic ring.

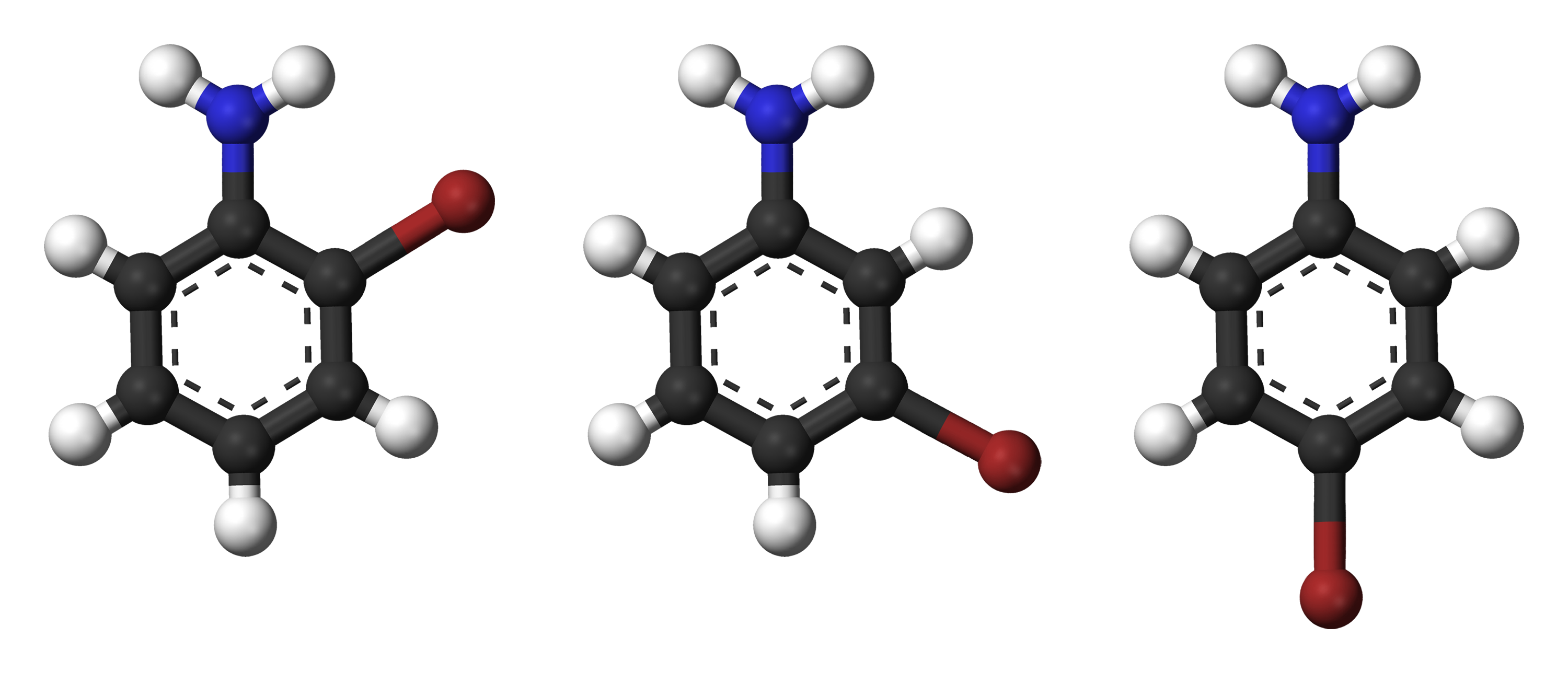
Bromoaniline isomers

Arene substitution patterns

The three isomers are:

- 2-Bromoaniline (o-Bromoaniline)
- 3-Bromoaniline (m-Bromoaniline)
- 4-Bromoaniline (p-Bromoaniline)
