= Fenpropimorph =

Names
- IUPAC name cis-2,6-Dimethyl-4-{{#parsoidfragment:0}}{2-methyl-3-[4-(2-methyl-2-propanyl)phenyl]propyl}morpholine or (2R,6S)-4-[3-(4-tert-butylphenyl)-2-methylpropyl]-2,6-dimethylmorpholine
- Other names BAS 42100F; Corbel; Forbel 750; Mistral

Identifiers
CAS Number	67564-91-4
3D model (JSmol)	Interactive image
ChEBI	CHEBI:50145
ChEMBL	ChEMBL372700
ChemSpider	84290
ECHA InfoCard	100.060.636
PubChem CID	93365
UNII	4548UM725F
CompTox Dashboard (EPA)	DTXSID901045927 DTXSID4034601, DTXSID901045927
- InChI: InChI=1S/C20H33NO/c1-15(12-21-13-16(2)22-17(3)14-21)11-18-7-9-19(10-8-18)20(4,5)6/h7-10,15-17H,11-14H2,1-6H3/t15?,16-,17+ Key: RYAUSSKQMZRMAI-ALOPSCKCSA-N; InChI=1/C20H33NO/c1-15(12-21-13-16(2)22-17(3)14-21)11-18-7-9-19(10-8-18)20(4,5)6/h7-10,15-17H,11-14H2,1-6H3/t15?,16-,17+ Key: RYAUSSKQMZRMAI-ALOPSCKCBN
- SMILES: O2[C@H](CN(CC(C)Cc1ccc(cc1)C(C)(C)C)C[C@H]2C)C

Properties
Chemical formula	C_{20}H_{33}NO
Molar mass	303.490 g·mol^{−1}
Appearance	Colorless liquid
Boiling point	120 °C (248 °F; 393 K) (0.067 mbar)
Solubility in water	4.3 mg/L (20 °C)
- Except where otherwise noted, data are given for materials in their standard state (at 25 °C [77 °F], 100 kPa). Infobox references

Fenpropimorph is a morpholine-derived fungicide used in agriculture, primarily on cereal crops such as wheat. It has been reported to disrupt eukaryotic sterol biosynthesis pathways, notably by inhibiting fungal Δ^{14} reductases. It has also been reported to inhibit mammalian sterol biosynthesis by affecting lanosterol demethylation. Although used in agriculture for pest management purposes, it has been reported to have a strong adverse effect on sterol biosynthesis in higher-plants by inhibiting the cycloeucalenol-obtusifoliol isomerase. This inhibition was shown to not only alter the lipid composition of the plasma-membrane, but also impact cell division and growth, in plants.

In addition to its effects on fungi, fenpropimorph is also a very high affinity ligand of the mammalian sigma receptor.

== See also ==
- Amorolfine - same core structure but with a tert-amyl group in place of the tert-butyl
