= TCMTB =

Names
- Preferred IUPAC name [(1,3-benzothiazol-2-yl)sulfanyl]methyl thiocyanate
- Other names: 2-(Thiocyanomethylthio)benzothiazole; Thiocyanic acid 2-(benzothiazolethio) methyl ester; Casacide

Identifiers
CAS Number	21564-17-0
3D model (JSmol)	Interactive image
ChEMBL	ChEMBL1903976
ChemSpider	28480
ECHA InfoCard	100.040.390
EC Number	244-445-0
PubChem CID	30692
RTECS number	XK8150900
UNII	5GE166YVQV
CompTox Dashboard (EPA)	DTXSID6032647
- InChI: InChI=1S/C9H6N2S3/c10-5-12-6-13-9-11-7-3-1-2-4-8(7)14-9/h1-4H,6H2 Key: TUBQDCKAWGHZPF-UHFFFAOYSA-N
- SMILES: C1=CC=C2C(=C1)N=C(S2)SCSC#N

Properties
Chemical formula	C_{9}H_{6}N_{2}S_{3}
Molar mass	238.34 g·mol^{−1}
Appearance	Red to brown liquid with pungent odor
Density	1.05
Melting point	−10 °C (14 °F; 263 K)
Boiling point	191 °C (376 °F; 464 K)
Solubility in water	Very slightly soluble (0.125 g/L at 24 °C)
log P	3.23
Vapor pressure	9.0×10^{−6} mmHg

Hazards
- GHS labelling
Pictograms	(GHS06: Toxic) (GHS08: Health hazard) (GHS09: Environmental hazard) (GHS07: Exclamation mark)
Signal word	Danger
Hazard statements	H302, H312, H315, H317, H319, H330, H410
Precautionary statements	P260, P264, P270, P271, P272, P273, P280, P284, P301+P312, P302+P352, P304+P340, P305+P351+P338, P310, P312, P320, P321, P330, P332+P313, P333+P313, P337+P313, P362, P363, P391, P403+P233, P405, P501
- Lethal dose or concentration (LD, LC)
LD_{50} (median dose)	679 mg/kg (rat, oral); 200 mg/kg (rabbit, dermal)
- Except where otherwise noted, data are given for materials in their standard state (at 25 °C [77 °F], 100 kPa). Infobox references

(Benzothiazol-2-ylthio)methyl thiocyanate (TCMTB) is a chemical compound classified as a benzothiazole.

== Properties ==
TCMTB is an oily, flammable, red to brown liquid with a pungent odor that is very slightly soluble in water. It decomposes on heating producing hydrogen cyanide, sulfur oxides, and nitrogen oxides. The degradation products are 2-mercaptobenzothiazole (2-MBT) and 2-benzothiazolesulfonic acid.

== Uses ==
TCMTB is used as wideband microbicide, paint fungicide, and paint gallicide. The active substance approved in 1980 in the United States. It is used, for example, in leather preservation, for the protection of paper products, in wood preservatives, and against germs in industrial water.

In the US, TCMTB is used as a fungicide for seed dressing in cereals, safflower, cotton and sugar beet.

It is also used when dealing with fungal problems when extracting hydrocarbons via fracking.

== Approval ==
TCMTB is not an authorized plant protection product in the European Union. In Germany, Austria and Switzerland, no plant protection products containing this active substance are authorized.

TCMTB contributes to health problems in tannery workers as it is a potential carcinogen, and is a hepatotoxin. It is also a skin sensitizer, and may cause contact dermatitis in those exposed to the poisonous compound. Hence, it is mainly used in developing countries.
