= 2-Chlorostyrene =

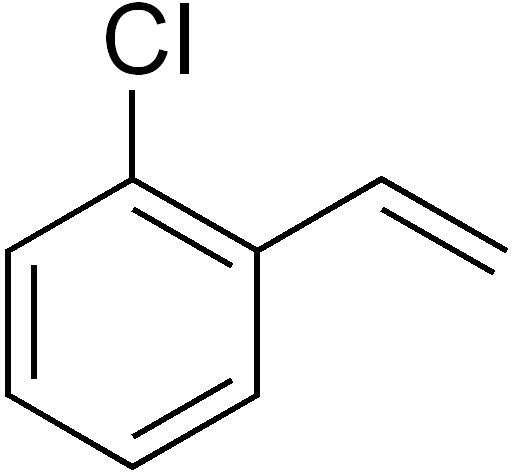

Names
- Preferred IUPAC name 1-Chloro-2-ethenylbenzene
- Other names 1-Chloro-2-vinylbenzene; 2-Chlorostyrene o-Chlorostyrene ortho-Chlorostyrene

Identifiers
CAS Number	2039-87-4
3D model (JSmol)	Interactive image; Interactive image
ChemSpider	14205
ECHA InfoCard	100.016.389
PubChem CID	14906
RTECS number	WL4160000
UNII	ZA43R4Q315
UN number	1993
CompTox Dashboard (EPA)	DTXSID3024811
- InChI: InChI=1S/C8H7Cl/c1-2-7-5-3-4-6-8(7)9/h2-6H,1H2 Key: ISRGONDNXBCDBM-UHFFFAOYSA-N; InChI=1/C8H7Cl/c1-2-7-5-3-4-6-8(7)9/h2-6H,1H2 Key: ISRGONDNXBCDBM-UHFFFAOYAD
- SMILES: Clc1ccccc1C=C; C=Cc1ccccc1Cl

Properties
Chemical formula	C_{8}H_{7}Cl
Molar mass	138.59 g/mol
Appearance	colorless liquid
Density	1.088 g/cm^{3}
Melting point	−63.1 °C (−81.6 °F; 210.1 K)
Boiling point	189 °C (372 °F; 462 K)
Solubility in water	Insoluble
Vapor pressure	0.96 mmHg (25°C)

Hazards
- GHS labelling
Pictograms	(GHS02: Flammable) (GHS07: Exclamation mark) (GHS08: Health hazard)
Signal word	Danger
Hazard statements	H226, H332, H350
Precautionary statements	P201, P202, P210, P233, P240, P241, P242, P243, P261, P264, P271, P280, P281, P302+P352, P303+P361+P353, P304+P312, P304+P340, P305+P351+P338, P308+P313, P312, P321, P332+P313, P337+P313, P362, P370+P378, P403+P233, P403+P235, P405, P501
Flash point	60.4 °C (140.7 °F; 333.5 K)
- NIOSH (US health exposure limits)
PEL (Permissible)	none
REL (Recommended)	TWA 50 ppm (285 mg/m^{3}) ST 75 ppm (428 mg/m^{3})
IDLH (Immediate danger)	N.D.
- Except where otherwise noted, data are given for materials in their standard state (at 25 °C [77 °F], 100 kPa). verify (what is ?) Infobox references

2-Chlorostyrene is a chlorinated derivative of styrene with the chemical formula C_{8}H_{7}Cl.
