= Burgundy mixture =

Fungicidal spray

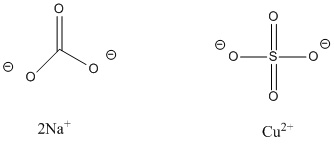
Chemical structure of Burgundy mixture

Burgundy mixture, named after the French district where it was first used to treat grapes and vines, is a mixture of copper sulfate and sodium carbonate. This mixture, which can have an overall copper concentration within the range of 1% through 20%, is used as a fungicidal spray for trees and small fruits.

== History ==
Similar to the Bordeaux mixture, one of the earliest fungicides in use, Burgundy mixture, also known as “sal soda Bordeaux”, is used as a fungus preventative applicant on plants before fungi have appeared. Bordeaux mixture contains copper(II) sulfate, CuSO_{4}, and hydrated lime, Ca(OH)_{2}, while Burgundy mixture contains copper sulfate, CuSO_{4}, and sodium carbonate, Na_{2}CO_{3}. First used around 1885, Burgundy mixture has since been replaced by synthetic organic compounds, or by compounds that contain copper in a non-reactive, chelated form. This helps to prevent the accumulation of high levels of copper in sediments surrounding the plants.

== Synthesis and composition ==
Burgundy mixture is made by combining dissolved copper sulfate and dissolved sodium carbonate. Dissolved copper sulfate ratios generally range from 1:1 to 1:18. Sodium carbonate is generally added in higher quantities and at a dissolved ratio of 1:1.5. Over time, the sodium carbonate will crystallize out of solution, and the closer the copper sulfate to carbonate mixture is to 1:1 ratios, the faster this process occurs. This property is one key factor in the general discontinued usage of Burgundy mixture, as the mixture must be mixed shortly before intended utilization.

== Uses and mode of action ==
Burgundy mixture is used as a preemptive fungicide prevention for trees and small fruits. This occurs because the Cu(II) ions are capable of interfering with enzymes found within the spores of many fungi, preventing germination from occurring. Unfortunately, the mechanism for copper antifungal properties is not well understood, though it is thought that interactions between the copper and negatively charged portions of the cellular membranes of the fungi promote an altered shape and increased membrane permeability, which alters the homeostasis of the cell and can lead to insufficient uptake and storage of essential nutrients and ions.
