= Pramiconazole =

Chemical compound

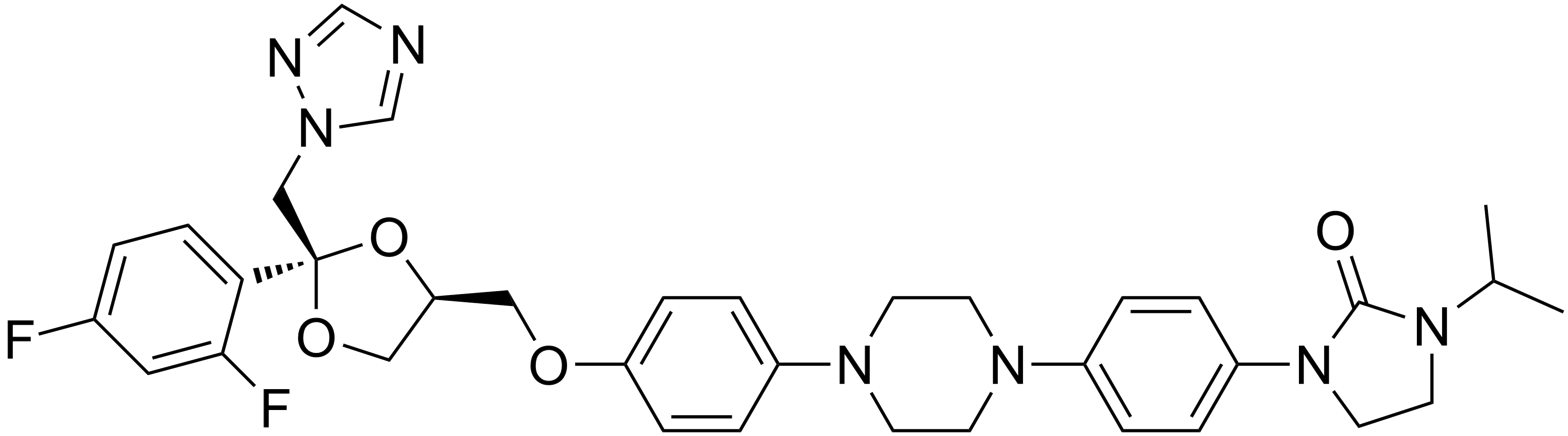

Clinical data
- Routes of administration: By mouth
- ATC code: none

Identifiers
- IUPAC name: 1-{4-[4-(4-{[(2R,4S)-2-(2,4-difluorophenyl)-2-(1H-1,2,4-triazol-1-ylmethyl)-1,3-dioxolan-4-yl]methoxy}phenyl)piperazin-1-yl]phenyl}-3-isopropylimidazolidin-2-one
- CAS Number: 219923-85-0
- PubChem CID: 3013050; 11411233
- ChemSpider: 2281806
- UNII: 4SYH0R661F
- ChEMBL: ChEMBL175797

Chemical and physical data
- Formula: C_{35}H_{39}F_{2}N_{7}O_{4}
- Molar mass: 659.739 g·mol^{−1}
- 3D model (JSmol): Interactive image
- SMILES: CC(C)N1CCN(C1=O)c2ccc(cc2)N3CCN(CC3)c4ccc(cc4)OC[C@H]5OC[C@](O5)(Cn6cncn6)c7ccc(cc7F)F
- InChI: InChI=1S/C35H39F2N7O4/c1-25(2)43-17-18-44(34(43)45)29-6-4-27(5-7-29)40-13-15-41(16-14-40)28-8-10-30(11-9-28)46-20-33-47-22-35(48-33,21-42-24-38-23-39-42)31-12-3-26(36)19-32(31)37/h3-12,19,23-25,33H,13-18,20-22H2,1-2H3/t33-,35+/m0/s1; Key:AEKNYBWUEYNWMJ-QWOOXDRHSA-N

Pramiconazole is a triazole antifungal which was under development by Barrier Therapeutics for the treatment of acute skin and mucosal fungal infections but was never marketed.
