= Streptomyces cacaoi =

Scientific classification
- Domain: Bacteria
- Kingdom: Bacillati
- Phylum: Actinomycetota
- Class: Actinomycetes
- Order: Streptomycetales
- Family: Streptomycetaceae
- Genus: Streptomyces
- Species: S. cacaoi

Binomial name
- Streptomyces cacaoi (Waksman 1932) Waksman and Henrici 1948 (Approved Lists 1980)

Type strain
- AS 4.1466, ATCC 19732, ATCC 3082, BCRC 12103, CBS 471.68, CCRC 12103, CGMCC 4.1466, DSM 40057, ETH 14304, ETH 31596, ETH 9877, IFO 12748, IMET 40260, IMRU 3082, ISP 5057, JCM 4352, KCC S-0352, KCCM 12607, KCCS-0352, KCTC 9758, Lanoot R-8682, LMG 19320, NBRC 12748, NCIB 9626, NCIMB 9626, NRRL B-1220, NRRL B-B-2686, NRRL B-1220, NRRL B-2686, NRRL-ISP 5057, PSA 110, R-8682, RIA 1013, RIA 94, UNIQEM 123, VKM Ac-733, WC 3082

Synonyms
- "Actinomyces cacaoi" Waksman 1932; Streptomyces aminophilus Foster 1961 (Approved Lists 1980)

Species of bacterium

Streptomyces cacaoi is a bacterium species from the genus of Streptomyces. Streptomyces cacaoi produces polyoxine.

== See also ==
- List of Streptomyces species
