= Polyoxins =

Polyoxin D

Polyoxins are a group of peptidyl nucleoside antibiotics. They are a complex produced by Streptomyces cacaoi var. asoensis and S. piomogenus. Polyoxin compounds contain the same base structure but differ in the composition of certain functional groups. At least fifteen polyoxin compounds are known, designated as polyoxin A, B, C and so forth. Polyoxins A through O are known and all except for 'C' and 'I' have fungicidal activity against phytopathogenic fungi. Some polyoxins have been used as agricultural fungicides because of this.

Polyoxins work by inhibiting the biosynthesis of chitin.
