= Cyclobutrifluram =

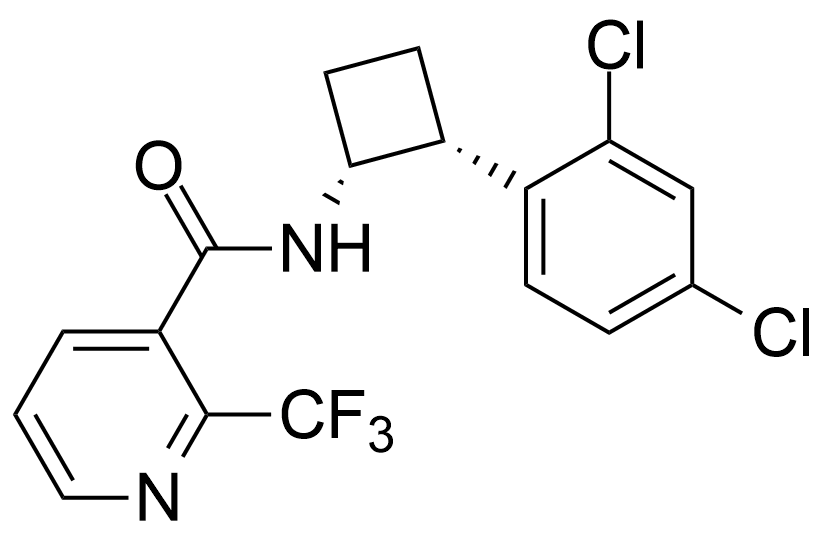

Names
- Preferred IUPAC name N-[(1R,2R)-2-(2,4-dichlorophenyl)cyclobutyl]-2-(trifluoromethyl)pyridine-3-carboxamide

Identifiers
CAS Number	1460292-16-3
3D model (JSmol)	Interactive image
ChEBI	CHEBI:192261
ChemSpider	128920200
ECHA InfoCard	100.307.361
EC Number	942-593-7
PubChem CID	71766128
UNII	8M88L532QV
- InChI: InChI=1S/C17H13Cl2F3N2O/c18-9-3-4-10(13(19)8-9)11-5-6-14(11)24-16(25)12-2-1-7-23-15(12)17(20,21)22/h1-4,7-8,11,14H,5-6H2,(H,24,25)/t11-,14-/m1/s1 Key: GBFKIHJZPMECCF-BXUZGUMPSA-N
- SMILES: C1C[C@H]([C@H]1C2=C(C=C(C=C2)Cl)Cl)NC(=O)C3=C(N=CC=C3)C(F)(F)F

Properties
Chemical formula	C_{17}H_{13}Cl_{2}F_{3}N_{2}O
Molar mass	389.20 g·mol^{−1}
- Except where otherwise noted, data are given for materials in their standard state (at 25 °C [77 °F], 100 kPa). Infobox references

Cyclobutrifluram is a chemical compound which acts as a nematicide and also shows antifungal effects against Fusarium species. It was first approved for agricultural use in 2025.

Cyclobutrifluram products are mainly used in landscaping (turfgrass and ornamental plants, golf courses, lawns, sports fields and parks) with some agricultural uses (romaine lettuce, seed coatings, and juvenile fruit and nut trees).

== Safety ==
Concerns have been raised about cyclobutrifluram and several other recently approved pesticides due to their high persistence in the environment and metabolism to trifluoroacetic acid. This pesticide is also toxic to oysters.
