= Uniconazole =

Names
- IUPAC name (E)-1-(4-Chlorophenyl)-4,4-dimethyl-2-(1,2,4-triazol-1-yl)pent-1-en-3-ol

Identifiers
CAS Number	83657-22-1
3D model (JSmol)	Interactive image
Beilstein Reference	7517240
ChEBI	CHEBI:38000
ChEMBL	ChEMBL138177
ChemSpider	4941263
ECHA InfoCard	100.108.800
EC Number	617-483-4
KEGG	C18494
PubChem CID	6436604
UNII	R4ATA06H50
CompTox Dashboard (EPA)	DTXSID7032505
- InChI: InChI=1S/C15H18ClN3O/c1-15(2,3)14(20)13(19-10-17-9-18-19)8-11-4-6-12(16)7-5-11/h4-10,14,20H,1-3H3/b13-8+ Key: YNWVFADWVLCOPU-MDWZMJQESA-N
- SMILES: CC(C)(C)C(C(=CC1=CC=C(C=C1)Cl)N2C=NC=N2)O

Properties
Chemical formula	C_{15}H_{18}ClN_{3}O
Molar mass	291.78 g·mol^{−1}
Appearance	White-light brown powder
Density	1.28 g/mL
Melting point	152.1–155.0 °C (305.8–311.0 °F; 425.2–428.1 K)
Solubility in water	8.41 mg/L

Hazards
- GHS labelling
Pictograms	(GHS07: Exclamation mark)
Signal word	Warning
Hazard statements	H302
Precautionary statements	P264, P270, P301+P317, P330, P501
- Except where otherwise noted, data are given for materials in their standard state (at 25 °C [77 °F], 100 kPa). Infobox references

Uniconazole is a triazole chemical used as a plant growth retardant. It is active on a wide range of plants and acts by inhibiting the production of gibberellins.

== Uses ==
Uniconazole is applied to plants to restrain their growth. It is often used on perennials to maintain a marketable size and/or delay flowering. Leaves usually appear darker after application because uniconazole increases chlorophyll content.

== Commercial products ==
The following products labeled for application to ornamental plants as plant growth retardants in the United States contain uniconazole:

- Concise
- Sumagic

Sunny is an Australian product containing uniconazole that is labeled for application to avocado trees to improve fruit size and quality.

== Application methods ==
Uniconazole products can be sprayed onto plant foliage or applied to the soil. After it is taken up by plant roots, uniconazole is translocated in the xylem. The restricted-entry interval for Concise or Sumagic is 12 hours.

== Reversing the effects of over-application ==
Over-application of any growth retardant can be devastating to a crop. One way to reverse excessive stunting is to apply gibberellins A4 + A7 and benzyl adenine. In the United States a product called Fresco is labeled for this use.

== See also ==
- Paclobutrazol
