= Hexaconazole =

- Kekulé, skeletal formula of hexaconazole

Names
- Systematic IUPAC name 2-(2,4-Dichlorophenyl)-1-(1H-1,2,4-triazol-1-yl)hexan-2-ol

Identifiers
CAS Number	79983-71-4
3D model (JSmol)	Interactive image; Interactive image
Beilstein Reference	8328399
ChemSpider	59833; 21173802 (S)
ECHA InfoCard	100.101.232
EC Number	413-050-7
KEGG	C18466
MeSH	Hexaconazole
PubChem CID	66461; 37888330 (R); 37888329 (S)
RTECS number	XZ4803200
UNII	SX9R3X1FQV
UN number	3077
CompTox Dashboard (EPA)	DTXSID4034653
- InChI: InChI=1S/C14H17Cl2N3O/c1-2-3-6-14(20,8-19-10-17-9-18-19)12-5-4-11(15)7-13(12)16/h4-5,7,9-10,20H,2-3,6,8H2,1H3 Key: STMIIPIFODONDC-UHFFFAOYSA-N
- SMILES: CCCCC(O)(Cn1cncn1)c1ccc(Cl)cc1Cl; CCCCC(O)(CN1C=NC=N1)C1=CC=C(Cl)C=C1Cl

Properties
Chemical formula	C_{14}H_{17}Cl_{2}N_{3}O
Molar mass	314.21 g·mol^{−1}
Appearance	White crystalline solid
Melting point	111 °C (232 °F; 384 K)

Hazards
- GHS labelling
Pictograms	(GHS07: Exclamation mark) (GHS09: Environmental hazard)
Signal word	Warning
Hazard statements	H302, H317, H411
Precautionary statements	P273, P280
- Lethal dose or concentration (LD, LC)
LD_{50} (median dose)	6071 mg/kg (oral, female rat)
- Except where otherwise noted, data are given for materials in their standard state (at 25 °C [77 °F], 100 kPa). Infobox references

Hexaconazole is a broad-spectrum systemic triazole fungicide used for the control of many fungi particularly Ascomycetes and Basidiomycetes. Major consumption is in Asian countries and it is used mainly for the control of rice sheath blight in China, India, Vietnam, and parts of East Asia. It is also used for control of diseases in various fruits and vegetables, such as tomatoes.
