= Methyldibromo glutaronitrile =

Names
- IUPAC name 2-Bromo-2-(bromomethyl)-pentanedinitrile
- Other names 1,2-Dibromo-2,4-dicyanobutane; 1-Bromo-1-(bromomethyl)-1,3-propanedicarbonitrile; 2-Bromo-2-(bromomethyl) glutaronitrile 2-Bromo-2-(bromomethyl)pentanedinitrile; Bromothalonil; Euxyl K400; Tektamer 38; Merquat 2200; Metacide 38

Identifiers
CAS Number	35691-65-7
3D model (JSmol)	Interactive image
ChEBI	CHEBI:62823
ChemSpider	55806
ECHA InfoCard	100.047.877
EC Number	252-681-0
PubChem CID	61948
UNII	YX089CPS05
CompTox Dashboard (EPA)	DTXSID3024944
- InChI: InChI=1S/C6H6Br2N2/c7-4-6(8,5-10)2-1-3-9/h1-2,4H2 Key: DHVLDKHFGIVEIP-UHFFFAOYSA-N; InChI=1/C6H6Br2N2/c7-4-6(8,5-10)2-1-3-9/h1-2,4H2 Key: DHVLDKHFGIVEIP-UHFFFAOYAK
- SMILES: C(CC(CBr)(C#N)Br)C#N

Properties
Chemical formula	C_{6}H_{6}Br_{2}N_{2}
Molar mass	265.936 g·mol^{−1}
Appearance	White to yellow crystals
Melting point	51.2 to 52.5 °C (124.2 to 126.5 °F; 324.3 to 325.6 K)
Boiling point	212 °C (414 °F; 485 K)
- Except where otherwise noted, data are given for materials in their standard state (at 25 °C [77 °F], 100 kPa). Infobox references

Methyldibromo glutaronitrile (MDBGN) is a widely used preservative.

It is made by reacting bromine with 2-methyleneglutaronitrile below 30 °C. An allergy to the chemical can be discovered by performing a patch test.

== History and allergy ==
In the mid-1980s, a maximum concentration of 0.1% in stay-on and rinse-off cosmetics was allowed. It was discovered soon afterwards that it caused allergic contact dermatitis to people with eczema.

It has been in use since the 1990s as a preservative in skin care products such as lotions, wet wipes, shampoo, and liquid soaps. Industrial applications include its use in preserving oils, glues, and medical gels.

In 2005, the EU banned its use in stay-on products, and in 2007 banned it in rinse-off products.

In 2005–06, methyldibromoglutaronitrile/ phenoxyethanol was the ninth-most-prevalent allergen in patch tests (5.8%).
