= 1,2,4,5-Tetrachloro-3-nitrobenzene =

Names
- IUPAC name 1,2,4,5-Tetrachloro-3-nitrobenzene
- Other names: Tecnazene; TCNB; 2,3,5,6-Tetrachloronitrobenzene

Identifiers
CAS Number	117-18-0
3D model (JSmol)	Interactive image
ChemSpider	21106573
ECHA InfoCard	100.003.799
EC Number	204-178-2
PubChem CID	8330
UNII	02X6KNJ5EE
CompTox Dashboard (EPA)	DTXSID0026098
- InChI: InChI=1S/C6HCl4NO2/c7-2-1-3(8)5(10)6(4(2)9)11(12)13/h1H Key: XQTLDIFVVHJORV-UHFFFAOYSA-N
- SMILES: C1=C(C(=C(C(=C1Cl)Cl)[N+](=O)[O-])Cl)Cl

Properties
Chemical formula	C_{6}HCl_{4}NO_{2}
Molar mass	260.88 g·mol^{−1}
Appearance	Colorless
Odor	Odorless
Density	1.862 g/cm^{3}
Melting point	99 °C (210 °F; 372 K)
Boiling point	304 °C (579 °F; 577 K) (decomposes)
Solubility in water	0.44 mg/L

Hazards
- GHS labelling
Pictograms	(GHS07: Exclamation mark) (GHS09: Environmental hazard)
Signal word	Danger
Hazard statements	H302, H317, H410
Precautionary statements	P273, P280, P301+P312+P330, P302+P352
- Lethal dose or concentration (LD, LC)
LD_{50} (median dose)	7.5 g/kg
- Except where otherwise noted, data are given for materials in their standard state (at 25 °C [77 °F], 100 kPa). Infobox references

1,2,4,5-Tetrachloro-3-nitrobenzene (tecnazene) is an organic compound with the formula HC_{6}Cl_{4}NO_{2}. It is a colorless solid. A related isomer is 1,2,3,4-tetrachloro-5-nitrobenzene.

It is used as a standard for quantitative analysis by nuclear magnetic resonance.

1,2,4,5-Tetrachloro-3-nitrobenzene is also a fungicide used to prevent dry rot and sprouting on potatoes during storage.
