= Diethofencarb =

Names
- Preferred IUPAC name propan-2-yl N-(3,4-diethoxyphenyl)carbamate
- Other names Diethofencarb

Identifiers
| CAS Number | 87130-20-9 |
| 3D model (JSmol) | Interactive image |
| Beilstein Reference | 8393454 |
| ChEBI | CHEBI:4520 |
| ChEMBL | ChEMBL1880404 |
| ChemSpider | 82840 |
| ECHA InfoCard | 100.118.674 |
| EC Number | 617-968-0 |
| KEGG | C11077 |
| PubChem CID | 91742 |
| UNII | 421BLT77U4 |
| CompTox Dashboard (EPA) | DTXSID5037527 |
- InChI: InChI=1S/C14H21NO4/c1-5-17-12-8-7-11(9-13(12)18-6-2)15-14(16)19-10(3)4/h7-10H,5-6H2,1-4H3,(H,15,16) Key: LNJNFVJKDJYTEU-UHFFFAOYSA-N
- SMILES: CCOC1=C(C=C(C=C1)NC(=O)OC(C)C)OCC

Properties
| Chemical formula | C_{14}H_{21}NO_{4} |
| Molar mass | 267.325 g·mol^{−1} |

Hazards
- GHS labelling
| Pictograms | (GHS07: Exclamation mark) |
| Signal word | Warning |
| Hazard statements | H319 |
| Precautionary statements | P264+P265, P280, P305+P351+P338, P337+P317 |
- Except where otherwise noted, data are given for materials in their standard state (at 25 °C [77 °F], 100 kPa). Infobox references

Diethofencarb is a carbamate fungicide which is used to control Botrytis infections on a variety of fruit and vegetable crops.
