= Flusilazole =

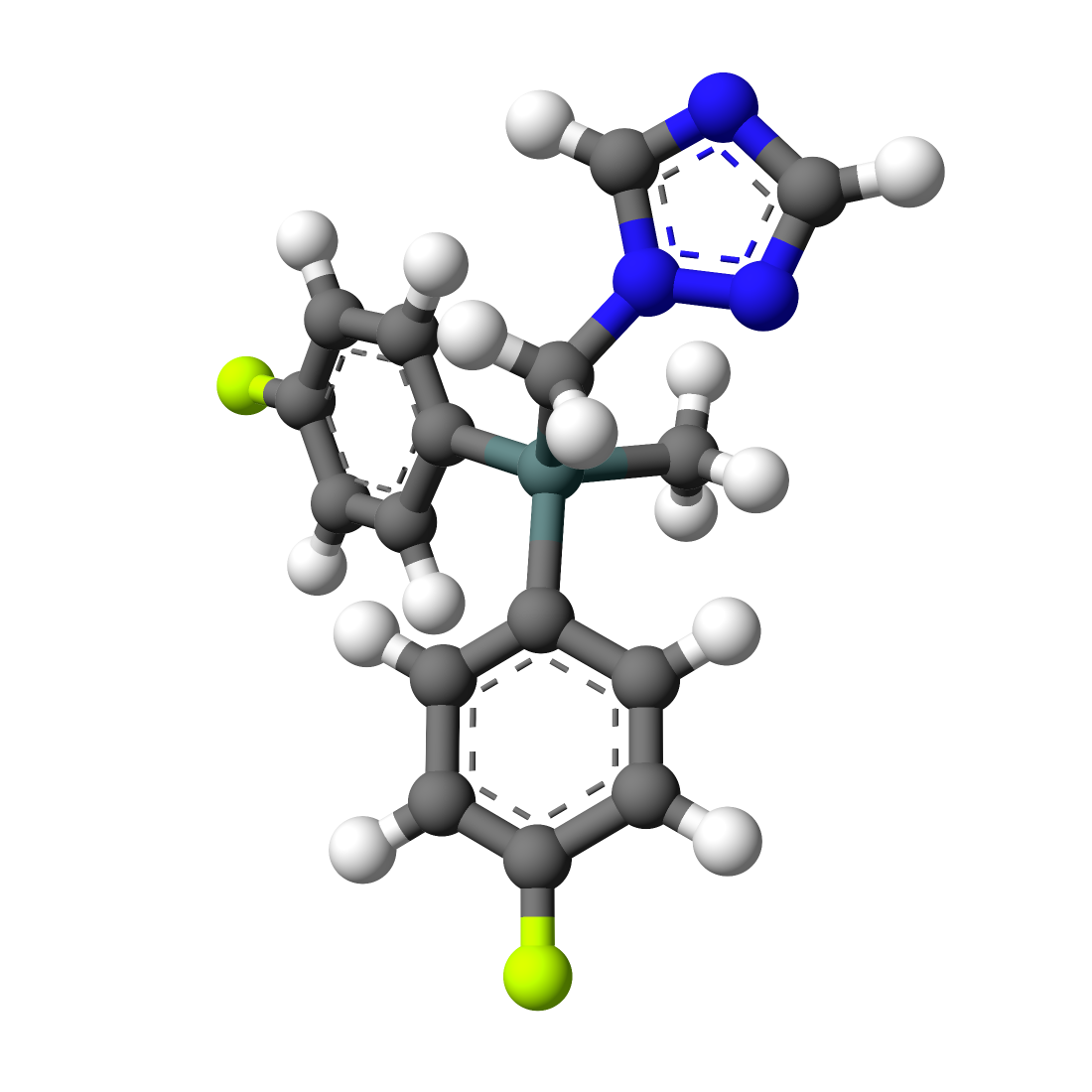

Names
- Preferred IUPAC name 1-{[Bis(4-fluorophenyl)(methyl)silyl]methyl}-1H-1,2,4-triazole
- Other names DPX-H6573;

Identifiers
CAS Number	85509-19-9
3D model (JSmol)	Interactive image
ChEBI	CHEBI:81922
ChemSpider	66326
ECHA InfoCard	100.107.525
PubChem CID	73675
UNII	F3WG2VVD87
CompTox Dashboard (EPA)	DTXSID3024235
- InChI: InChI=1S/C16H15F2N3Si/c1-22(12-21-11-19-10-20-21,15-6-2-13(17)3-7-15)16-8-4-14(18)5-9-16/h2-11H,12H2,1H3 Key: FQKUGOMFVDPBIZ-UHFFFAOYSA-N; InChI=1/C16H15F2N3Si/c1-22(12-21-11-19-10-20-21,15-6-2-13(17)3-7-15)16-8-4-14(18)5-9-16/h2-11H,12H2,1H3 Key: FQKUGOMFVDPBIZ-UHFFFAOYAI
- SMILES: c2ncnn2C[Si](C)(c(cc1)ccc1F)c3ccc(F)cc3

Properties
Chemical formula	C_{16}H_{15}F_{2}N_{3}Si
Molar mass	315.392 g/mol
Density	1.31 g/cm^{3}
Melting point	53–55 °C (127–131 °F; 326–328 K)
Solubility in water	41.9 mg/L (20 °C)
- Except where otherwise noted, data are given for materials in their standard state (at 25 °C [77 °F], 100 kPa). verify (what is ?) Infobox references

Flusilazole (DPX-H6573) is an organosilicon fungicide invented by DuPont, which is used to control fungal infections on a variety of fruit and vegetable crops. It is moderately toxic to animals and has been shown to produce birth defects in high doses.
