= Cyazofamid =

Names
- IUPAC name 4-chloro-2-cyano-N,N-dimethyl-5-(4-methylphenyl)imidazole-1-sulfonamide
- Other names IKF 916

Identifiers
| CAS Number | 120116-88-3 |
| 3D model (JSmol) | Interactive image |
| Beilstein Reference | 9064229 |
| ChEBI | CHEBI:81841 |
| ChEMBL | ChEMBL1863429 |
| ChemSpider | 8037772 |
| ECHA InfoCard | 100.111.751 |
| EC Number | 601-671-8 |
| KEGG | C18573 |
| PubChem CID | 9862076 |
| UNII | QJC4S2YQ4B |
| CompTox Dashboard (EPA) | DTXSID9034492 |
- InChI: InChI=1S/C13H13ClN4O2S/c1-9-4-6-10(7-5-9)12-13(14)16-11(8-15)18(12)21(19,20)17(2)3/h4-7H,1-3H3 Key: YXKMMRDKEKCERS-UHFFFAOYSA-N
- SMILES: CC1=CC=C(C=C1)C2=C(N=C(N2S(=O)(=O)N(C)C)C#N)Cl

Properties
| Chemical formula | C_{13}H_{13}ClN_{4}O_{2}S |
| Molar mass | 324.78 g·mol^{−1} |
| Density | 1.45 g/cm^{3} |
| Melting point | 152.7 °C |
| Solubility in water | 0.107 mg/L (20 °C) |
| log P | 3.2 |

Hazards
- GHS labelling
| Pictograms | (GHS09: Environmental hazard) |
| Signal word | Warning |
| Hazard statements | H410 |
| Precautionary statements | P273, P391, P501 |
- Except where otherwise noted, data are given for materials in their standard state (at 25 °C [77 °F], 100 kPa). Infobox references

Cyazofamid is a fungicide that is highly-specific in controlling oomycete plant pathogens such as Phytophthora infestans, the organism which causes late blight in potato. Its mode of action is thought to involve binding to the Q_{i} center of Coenzyme Q – cytochrome c reductase.

Cyazofamid is most often sold under the brand name Ranman.

== Synthesis ==
Processes to manufacture cyazofamid were disclosed in patents from Ishihara Sangyo Kaisha, Ltd. An acetophenone derivative was first treated with aqueous glyoxal and hydroxylamine to form an oxime-substituted imidazole ring system. This intermediate was treated with thionyl chloride and disulfur dichloride to convert the oxime to a cyano group and chlorinate the imidazole in the position next to the phenyl ring. Finally, treatment with dimethylsulfamoyl chloride gave cyazofamid, with the desired regiochemistry. This placed the sulfamoyl group on the nitrogen adjacent to the phenyl ring rather than the chlorine atom. The structure of the fungicide has been confirmed by X-ray crystallography.
