= Delta14-sterol reductase =

Class of enzymes

delta14-sterol reductase

Identifiers
- EC no.: 1.3.1.70

Databases
- IntEnz: IntEnz view
- BRENDA: BRENDA entry
- ExPASy: NiceZyme view
- KEGG: KEGG entry
- MetaCyc: metabolic pathway
- PRIAM: profile
- PDB structures: RCSB PDB PDBe PDBsum
- Gene Ontology: AmiGO / QuickGO
Search
- PMC: articles
- PubMed: articles
- NCBI: proteins

In enzymology, Delta14-sterol reductase (EC 1.3.1.70) is an enzyme that catalyzes the chemical reaction

14-demethyllanosterol
+ NADP^{+}
H^{+}
H^{+}
4,4-dimethyl-5α-cholesta-8,14,24-trien-3β-ol
+ NADPH

The two substrates of this enzyme are 14-demethyllanosterol and oxidised nicotinamide adenine dinucleotide phosphate (NADP^{+}). Its products are 4,4-dimethyl-5α-cholesta-8,14,24-trien-3β-ol, reduced NADPH, and a proton.

This enzyme belongs to the family of oxidoreductases, specifically those acting on the CH-CH group of donor with NAD+ or NADP+ as acceptor. The systematic name of this enzyme class is 4,4-dimethyl-5alpha-cholesta-8,24-dien-3beta-ol:NADP+ Delta14-oxidoreductase. This enzyme participates in biosynthesis of steroids.
