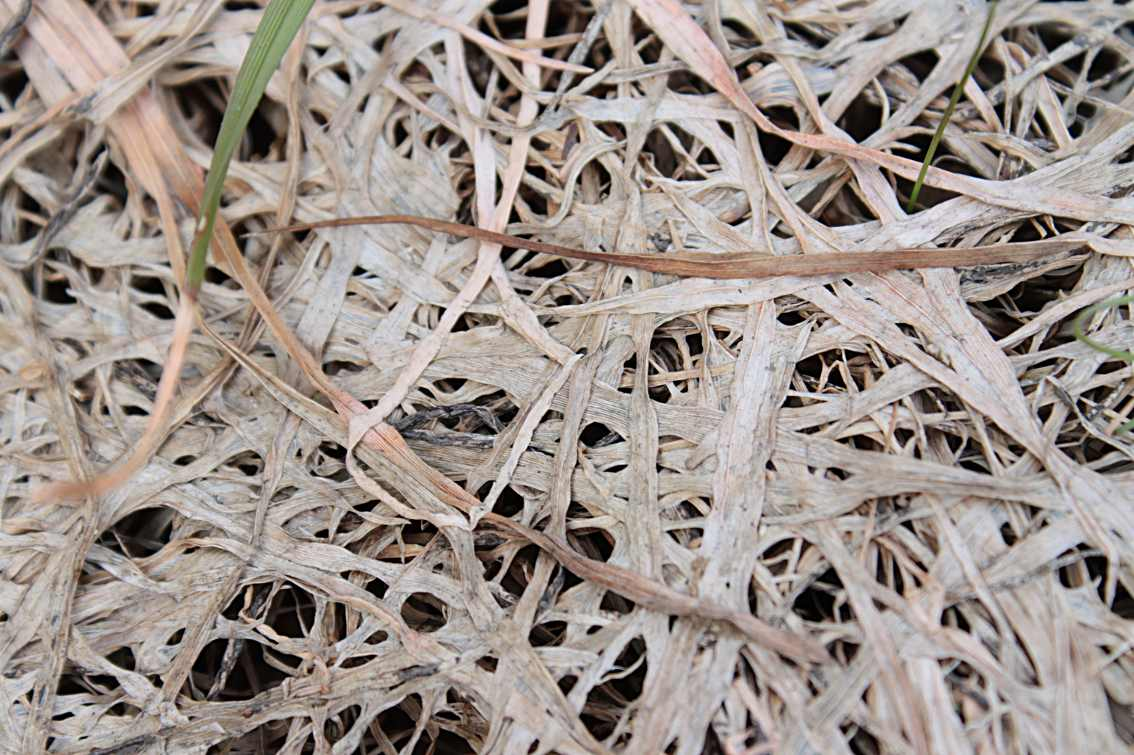
- Pink snow mold in a lawn in Brno Komín, Czech Republic

Scientific classification
- Kingdom: Fungi
- Division: Ascomycota
- Class: Sordariomycetes
- Order: Amphisphaeriales
- Family: Amphisphaeriaceae
- Genus: Microdochium
- Species: M. nivale

Binomial name
- Microdochium nivale (Fr.) Samuels & I.C. Hallett

Synonyms
- Calonectria graminicola; Calonectria nivalis; Fusarium nivale; Fusarium nivale; Fusarium nivale f.sp. graminicola; Fusarium nivale var. majus; Fusarium nivale var. nivale; Gerlachia nivalis; Gerlachia nivalis var. major; Gerlachia nivalis var. nivalis; Griphosphaeria nivalis; Lanosa nivalis; Melioliphila graminicola; Microdochium nivale var. majus; Microdochium nivale var. nivale; Micronectriella nivalis; Monographella nivalis; Monographella nivalis var. nivalis

= Fusarium patch =

Plant fungal disease

Fusarium patch is a disease in turf grass settings also called pink snow mold or Microdochium patch. In many cool season grass species in North America, it is caused by the fungus Microdochium nivale. The white-pink mycelium on infected leaf blades is a distinguishing characteristic of the Microdochium nivale pathogen. Fusarium patch is considered economically important in the turf grass industry because of its tendency to cause significant injury to golf greens, thereby decreasing putting surface quality. Unlike other snow molds, such as gray snow mold, Microdochium nivale does not need snow cover to cause widespread infection.

== Hosts and symptoms ==
M. nivale can infect all cool-season turf grass species. Annual bluegrass (Poa annua), perennial ryegrass (Lolium perenne) and creeping bentgrass (Agrostis stolonifera) are more susceptible. In the fall, M.nivale infection begins as small, orange to red-brown spots, circular and only a few centimeters in diameter. During the winter and into the spring seasons, well-defined, clustered, circular patches 10–20 cm in diameter, of necrotic leaf tissues form on mown turf. Microdochium nivale is mostly seen on grasses mown at heights of three inches or greater. On taller grass, patches often lack the circular pattern that is seen in shorter mown grass. Pink snow mold patches usually follow drainage patterns since conidia spores are readily dislodged and transported by rainfall and water flowage. Under prolonged cool and wet conditions, white-pink mycelium can be observed along the circumference of diseased patches.

== Disease cycle ==
M. nivale begins by oversummering (surviving the summer) in thatch or soil as haploid mycelium or spores. When cool, wet weather arrives in the fall or winter, the mycelium grows from thatch or soil and infects leaves. These environmental conditions also favor the development of asexual spores called conidia on conidiophores. These conidia infect leaf sheaths and blades near the soil. Wind and surface water help aid in the spread of this disease, as they allow for the spores to contact nearby healthy plants. The disease becomes very severe if allowed to spread from the leaf blades to the crown of the plant. This usually only happens under extreme circumstances, particularly if snowfall covers unfrozen ground.

== Environment ==
Microdochium nivale becomes problematic when turf experiences lengthy periods of cool, wet weather, typical of fall or spring and into early summer in the Northern Hemisphere. The name is somewhat confusing, because the presence of snow is not necessary for this pathogen to develop. The disease can thrive under snow cover, however, if it falls on unfrozen soil with thriving turf. In general, this disease tends to develop proficiently when grass is growing at a slower than normal rate. Limiting fall nitrogen applications in an attempt to decrease the growth of grass and promote dormancy can help decrease the incidence of pink snow mold. In regions of high humidity, and temperatures ranging between 32 and 46 °F (0 and 8 °C), pink snow mold will develop rapidly.

== Management ==
There are a number of different ways to manage diseases, including cultural, chemical, and biological controls. Some of these controls are more effective than others. The best approach to a managing any disease, including microdochium patch, is an integrated approach called Integrated Pest Management (IPM). IPM uses a combination of chemical, cultural and biological controls to reduce spending on pesticides and decrease pesticide resistance. The following are some of the most important cultural controls used in managing microdochium patch.

=== Cultural controls ===
Raising the mowing height is an easy way to reduce stress on a turfgrass plant and make the plant less susceptible to attack by disease, but there is a fine line. Turf mowed less than 2.5 inches (64 mm) or above 3 inches (76 mm) makes the plant more susceptible to disease.

Managing the moisture available to the plant can also reduce the incidence of disease. The pathogen that causes microdochium patch requires and thrives in moist, cool conditions; therefore, making sure not to overwater the turf when conditions are right for infection is very important. On the other hand, starving the turf of moisture can be damaging as this increases susceptibility to infection. Giving the plant only enough water for normal plant function is the best way to ensure disease pressure is reduced as much as possible. Managing thatch and soil drainage are two other important ways of controlling this disease, as both of these affect the amount of moisture that is available to create a favorable environment to the disease.

Managing the amount of nitrogen available to the plant is .lso important Avoiding excess fall nitrogen application will greatly reduce disease pressure of Microdochium nivale. OFurthermore, having ecess nitrogen available to plant produces rapid growth of above ,-round tissue. This tissue often has thin cell walls and is prone to attack by disease.

Despite the fact that the above cultural controls cannot completely control microdochium patch, when they are all used to reduce disease pressure, they can have a noticeable impact and will help to reduce the amount of chemical control that is required.

=== Chemical controls ===
Chemical controls (i.e. the use of fungicides) to specifically control turf grass diseases have been around since 1891. Over the years, better controls have been developed, all of which tend to be less toxic to animals and the environment when used properly.

There is a wide variety of chemical groups that are labeled for control of microdochium patch. They include, but are not limited to: methyl benzimidazole carbamates (MBCs) such as thiophanate methyl; dicarboximides such as iprodione and vinclozolin; DMIs such as fenarimol and propiconazole; QoIs such as azoxystrobin, pyraclostrobin, and trifloxystrobin; phenylpyrroles such as fludioxonil; certain aromatic hydrocarbons such as PCNB; and chloronitriles such as chlorothalonil.

These chemical classes should be rotated ao that selection pressure on the disease in limited, in order to avoid resistant strains of this disease. The best way to control microdochium patch, especially going into winter, is to use a three way spray right before the first snow fall. A combination of a dicarboximides such as iprodione, a chloronitrile such as chlorothalonil, and a DMI such as propiconazole will give sufficient control over the span of an average winter.

== Importance ==
Microdochium patch is a significant problem in the turfgrass management industry. Sports fields, sod farms and home lawns and golf courses can all be damaged by this the disease. The pathogen can be found in the Northern United States and all the way up into Canada, meaning that there is a large area where this pathogen can cause serious disease. The highest incidence of this disease in these areas occurs on golf courses, due to the highly managed areas of susceptible turfgrass species such as Creeping Bentgrass (Agrostis stolonifera) and Annual Bluegrass (Poa annua). It is of particular concern, because turf on golf courses is considered a high value crop. Diseases such a microdochium patch lower the value of the crop by decreasing its aesthetic value, affecting the playability, and decreasing the overall health of the turf. Because golf course budgets are often quite tight, the reduction of fungicide applications required in a season for snow mold will result in more money elsewhere in the budget. Being that the fungicide budget can be 10% of the maintenance budget, reductions in the use of fungicides can cause a significant increase in the amount of money to do other things. On top of that, reducing fungicide inputs helps keep the environment safe and reduces the chances of fungicide resistance development.

== See also ==
- Fusarium
- Fusarium wilt
- Snow mold
