= Neglecta =

Neglecta, a Latin word meaning neglected, may refer to:

- Columba livia neglecta, Hume, 1873, a subspecies of the rock pigeon found in the mountains of eastern Central Asia
- Dermatosis neglecta, a skin condition due to an accumulation of sebum, keratin, sweat, dirt, and debris
- Monographella nivalis var. neglecta, a plant pathogen
- Nerodia erythrogaster neglecta, the copperbelly water snake
- Sturnella neglecta, the western meadowlark
- Neglecta (genus), a bacteria genus
