= Pyonitrin =

- Pyonitrin A: R^{1} = Cl, R^{2} = H Pyonitrin B: R^{1} = H, R^{2} = Cl; Pyonitrin C: R^{1} = H, R^{2} = H Pyonitrin D: R^{1} = Cl, R^{2} = Cl

Identifiers
3D model (JSmol)	A: Interactive image; B: Interactive image; C: Interactive image; D: Interactive image
ChEBI	A: CHEBI:226083; B: CHEBI:226088; C: CHEBI:226093; D: CHEBI:226098
ChemSpider	A: 129558149; B: 129558184; C: 129558148; D: 129558151
PubChem CID	A: 146682097; B: 146682098; C: 146682099; D: 146682100
CompTox Dashboard (EPA)	A: DTXSID001336862; B: DTXSID701336863; C: DTXSID401336864; D: DTXSID101336865
- InChI: A: InChI=1S/C20H12ClN3OS/c21-14-6-3-5-11-12-8-9-22-18(12)19(24-17(11)14)15-10-26-20(23-15)13-4-1-2-7-16(13)25/h1-10,22,25H Key: AMINWEWPBYIIHI-UHFFFAOYSA-N; B: InChI=1S/C20H12ClN3OS/c21-13-9-22-19-17(13)11-5-1-3-7-14(11)23-18(19)15-10-26-20(24-15)12-6-2-4-8-16(12)25/h1-10,22,25H Key: XBMMXHKKPWDRNN-UHFFFAOYSA-N; C: InChI=1S/C20H13N3OS/c24-17-8-4-2-6-14(17)20-23-16(11-25-20)19-18-13(9-10-21-18)12-5-1-3-7-15(12)22-19/h1-11,21,24H Key: ZXSJQYOLQMMIHI-UHFFFAOYSA-N; D: InChI=1S/C20H11Cl2N3OS/c21-12-6-3-5-11-16-13(22)8-23-19(16)18(25-17(11)12)14-9-27-20(24-14)10-4-1-2-7-15(10)26/h1-9,23,26H Key: SUEYFBRHOFKAFG-UHFFFAOYSA-N
- SMILES: A: C1=CC=C(C(=C1)C2=NC(=CS2)C3=C4C(=C5C=CC=C(C5=N3)Cl)C=CN4)O; B: C1=CC=C2C(=C1)C3=C(C(=N2)C4=CSC(=N4)C5=CC=CC=C5O)NC=C3Cl; C: C1=CC=C2C(=C1)C3=C(C(=N2)C4=CSC(=N4)C5=CC=CC=C5O)NC=C3; D: C1=CC=C(C(=C1)C2=NC(=CS2)C3=C4C(=C5C=CC=C(C5=N3)Cl)C(=CN4)Cl)O
- Except where otherwise noted, data are given for materials in their standard state (at 25 °C [77 °F], 100 kPa). Infobox references

Pyonitrins are a family of unusual alkaloids discovered from an insect-associated Pseudomonas protegens strain. In vivo, pyonitrins A-D show activity against Candida albicans - the causative agent of oral thrush.

== Biosynthesis ==
The pyonitrins are structurally related to both pyochelin and pyrrolnitrin, two well-studied Pseudomonas spp. metabolites. In pyonitrins, the salicylic acid and thiazole rings are identical to those of pyochelin, and the chlorinated aromatic ring is quite similar to that of pyrrolnitrin. These observations indicate that the pathway of pyonitrins biosynthesis is a combination of biosynthetic machineries of these two metabolites. Further studies indicated that the pyochelin and pyrrolnitrin pathways were indeed largely intact.

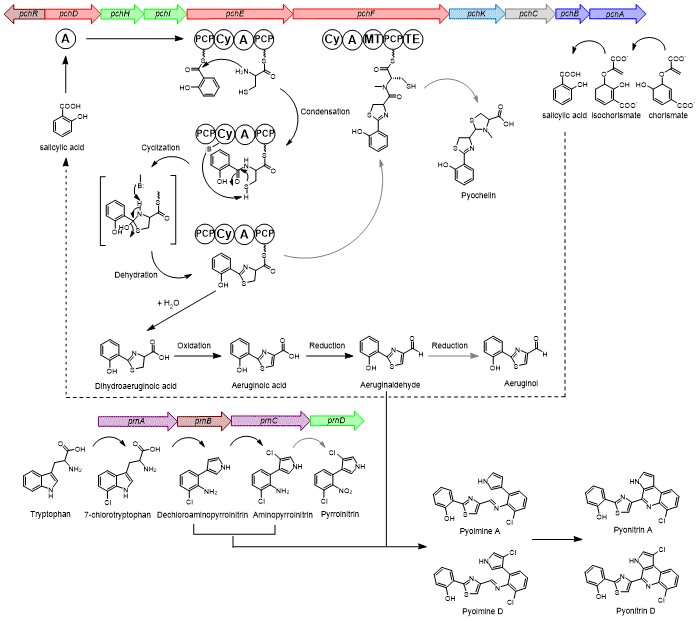
The proposed biosynthesis of Pyonitrins A−D.

For pyochelin half-pathway, salicylic acid is first synthesized from chorismate by pchA and pchB enzyme. Then it is activated by the pchD enzyme and is tethered to the pantothenate containing domain of the pchE non-ribosomal peptide synthetase (NRPS). The adenylation domain (A) of pchE activates a molecule of cysteine, which is then attached to the peptidyl carrier protein domain (PCP) of the same protein. In one instance, after condensation, cyclization and dehydration, dihydroaeruginoic acid may be released. The following sequential oxidation and reduction reactions produce aeruginaldehyde, which will be an intermediate utilized to obtain pyonitrin. It is worth mentioning that aeruginaldehyde may be further reduced to aeruginol by the pchK reductase. In the normal pathway leading to pyochelin synthesis, a second cysteine molecule is attached by the pchF NRPS and the molecule gets released by the thioesterase domain (TE) of pchF, and converted to the final product pyochelin by the pchK reductase together with nicotinamide adenine dinucleotide phosphate (NADPH) and S-adenosyl methionine (SAM).

For pyrrolnitrin half-pathway, the first step is the chlorination of tryptophan at the 7 position to form 7-chlorotryptophan. Then a rearrangement of the indole ring occurs, forming the phenylpyrrole ring, and followed by decarboxylation to form dechloroaminopyrrolnitrin. This intermediate is then chlorinated a second time to form another key intermediate aminopyrrolnitrin, which undergoes oxidation of the amino group to a nitro group to finally build pyrrolnitrin.

With aeruginaldehyde and dechloroaminopyrrolnitrin (or aminopyrrolnitrin) in hand, they will then undergo a spontaneous Pictet-Spengler condensation. Hence, the additional strategies in pyonitrin biosynthesis likely involves the generation of an imine, followed by an intramolecular electrophilic aromatic addition of the imine carbon onto the pyrrole ring. And the last step would be the rearomatization to yield the isolated pyonitrins A-D. Whether the current coupling is a chance occurrence or a purposeful biosynthetic assembly is not clear, but the pyonitrins derive their chimeric structures from two pathways joining at the metabolomic level.

== Total synthesis ==
Inspired by the proposed biosynthesis pathway, MacMillan group at UC Santa Cruz reported the first biomimetic total synthesis of pyonitrins A−D in three steps in February, 2020.
