= Microdochium phragmitis =

Scientific classification
- Kingdom: Fungi
- Division: Ascomycota
- Class: Sordariomycetes
- Order: Amphisphaeriales
- Family: Amphisphaeriaceae
- Genus: Microdochium
- Species: M. phragmitis

Binomial name
- Microdochium phragmitis Syd. & P. Syd.

Species of fungus

Microdochium phragmitis is a newly recovered species that mycologists are still distinguishing from other Microdochium species. This fungus has a regular Microdochium shape that can only be seen microscopically. There is no fruiting mushroom body, so finding it in the field can be difficult. It is categorized as an ascomycetous fungal plant pathogen.

== Taxonomy ==
This genus was first documented by Sydow (1924) on the plant Phragmites australis in Germany. M. phragmitis is commonly designated as an epitype because some conclusive features for identification are missing. The genus has approximately 20-48 species, but only a few are well known and have been studied. The species is typically classified as phytopathogenic and saprobic. There have yet to be chlamydospores observed in this genus, although it is a common characteristic in microdochium species.

== Description ==
The overall structure of the fungi is globose or oblong with some variation. One common trait between organisms is they almost always contain curved truncate bases and apices. The septa are usually 1-2 μm wide. It also contains hyaline cells, conoid conidiogenous cells, and solitary fusiform or subfalcate hyaline conidia. The structure is made up of conidiophores with conidogenous cells, hyaline cells, and relatively small septa. Conidia of the species are usually small apical structures brightly orange-colored and have leaf-like stroma. The small papillate conidiogenous cells have been visualized in many varying structure shapes including lageniform, cylindrical, terminal, sympodial, annedllidic, clavate, and even navicular. Similarly, conidia arise holoblastically and are usually solitary, fusiform, and dry.

== Ecology ==
Microdochium phragmitis is an endophyte fungus that has only been documented as living within Phragmites australis. As such, the host usually does not feel any negative symptoms associated with the apparent disease. The fungus colonizes the living roots of the common reed without causing harm, but can also be pathogenic to plants. More research is needed to learn about the pathogenic properties and diseases caused by the fungus. One thing researchers have shown is the ability of the fungus to participate in niche partitioning with Microdochium bolleyi on the colonized P. australis. There is a possibility of the fungus playing a role in an additional Spatio-temporal niche partitioning. Research has documented that the conidia are holoblastic in character, but the mechanics of the relationship are weakly defined in the literature.

== Habitat and geographical distribution ==
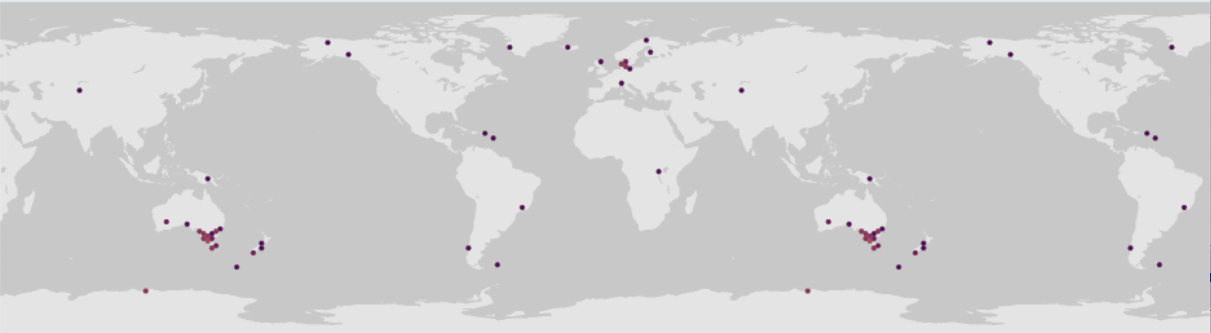
Distribution map of M. phragmitis

Microdochium phragmitis was first recovered in Poland on P. australis. Since then it has been found in other locations in Poland, Germany, and across the world. This genus is unique from other Microdochium species because it thrives on the roots in flooded habitats. It can still function on stems, leaves, or in dry conditions, just not as well as the former habitat type. This species flourishes in the colder months when the temperature stays at 20 degrees C or less. However, the fungus can survive in the warmer spring and summer months, but not at such a high rate.

== Importance ==
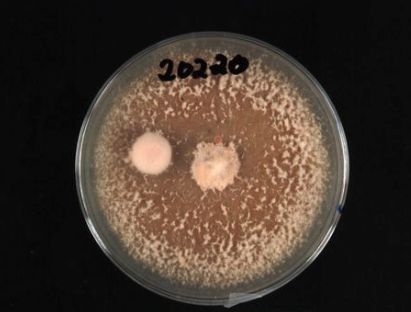
Living Specimen of M. phragmitis

Microdochium phragmitis can't be found on cultivated plants, but it can be cultured in the lab. This specific microdochium specie is not pathogenic. However, the genus has many pathogenic species including the popular snow mold plant pathogen. It also is closely related to fungal isolates obtained from salmon eggs (Verticillium dahliae, a plant pathogen). Significant research has not been completed yet as to the potential medicinal drug uses of the fungi, but it showed some cytotoxic activity in a human tumoral cell.

== Similar species ==
Microdochium phragmitis is often used as the baseline comparison for species of similar morphology and DNA sequences, however, there are no synonyms for this fungi. Until recently, M. phragmitis was undistinguished from the rest of the Microdochium species. Additionally, M. lycopodinum is presented as a sister clade. The two were differentiated after comparing the morphology and DNA sequences of the conidia spores in cell cultures.
