= Procymidone =

Names
- IUPAC name 3-(3,5-dichlorophenyl)-1,5-dimethyl-3-azabicyclo[3.1.0]hexane-2,4-dione

Identifiers
CAS Number	32809-16-8
3D model (JSmol)	Interactive image
ChEMBL	ChEMBL513678
ChemSpider	33326
KEGG	C10986
PubChem CID	36242
UNII	EC2FI67U2Y
- InChI: InChI=1S/C13H11Cl2NO2/c1-12-6-13(12,2)11(18)16(10(12)17)9-4-7(14)3-8(15)5-9/h3-5H,6H2,1-2H3 Key: QXJKBPAVAHBARF-UHFFFAOYSA-N
- SMILES: Clc1cc(cc(Cl)c1)N2C(=O)C3(C)CC3(C)C2=O

Properties
Chemical formula	C_{13}H_{11}Cl_{2}NO_{2}
Molar mass	284.138 g/mol
- Except where otherwise noted, data are given for materials in their standard state (at 25 °C [77 °F], 100 kPa). verify (what is ?) Infobox references

Procymidone is a pesticide. It is often used for killing unwanted ferns and nettles, and as a dicarboximide fungicide for killing fungi, for example as seed dressing, pre-harvest spray or post-harvest dip of lupins, grapes, stone fruit, strawberries. It is a known endocrine disruptor (androgen receptor antagonist) which interferes with the sexual differentiation of male rats. It is considered to be a poison.

== See also ==
- Phenothrin
- Prochloraz
- Vinclozolin
