= Nucleic acid quaternary structure =

Interactions between nucleic acid modules

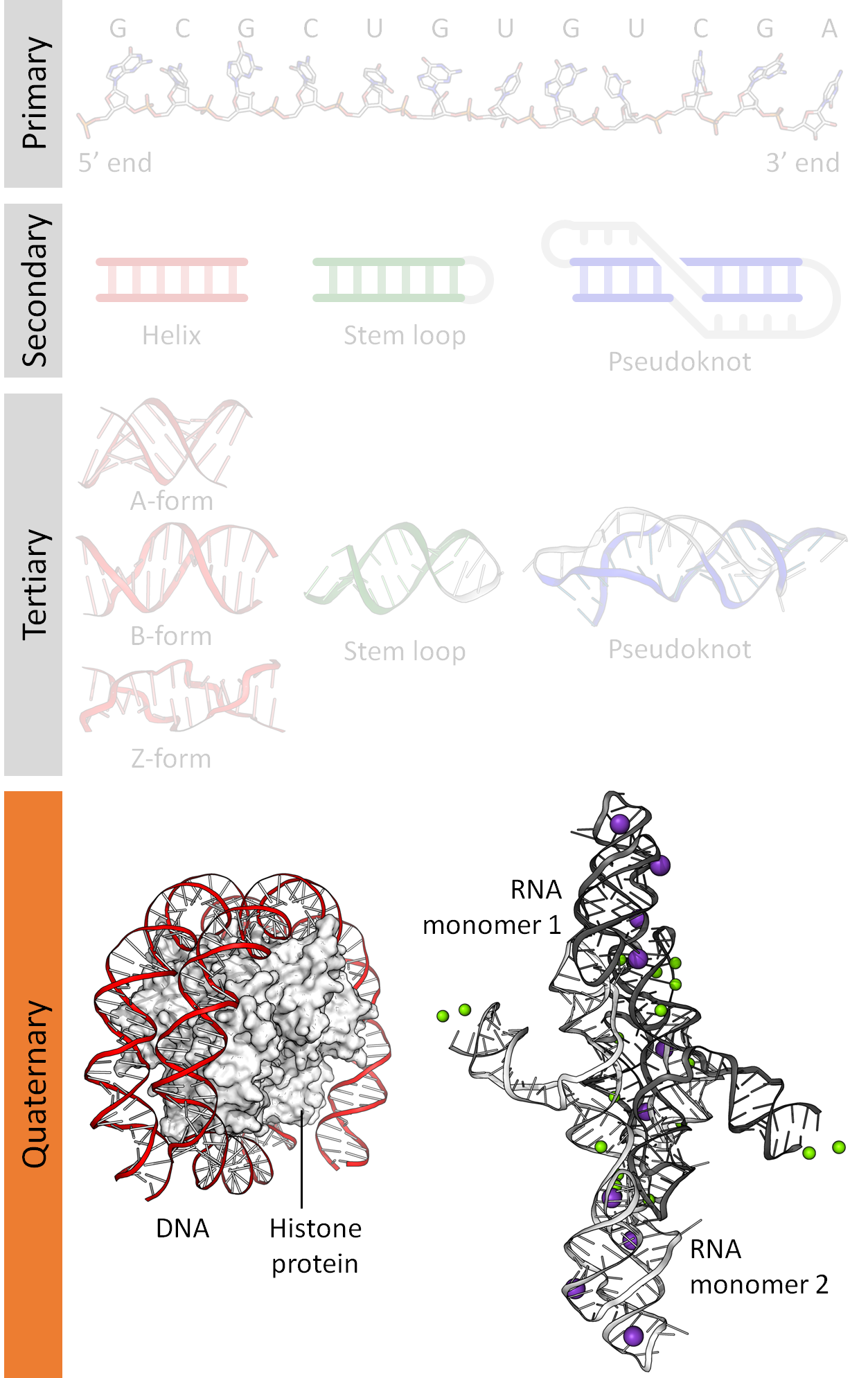
The image above contains clickable links Interactive image of nucleic acid structure (primary, secondary, tertiary, and quaternary) using DNA helices and examples from the VS ribozyme and telomerase and nucleosome. (PDB: ADNA, 1BNA, 4OCB, 4R4V, 1YMO, 1EQZ)

DNA coils and winds around histone proteins to condense into chromatin.

Nucleic acid quaternary structure refers to the interactions between separate nucleic acid molecules, or between nucleic acid molecules and proteins. The concept is analogous to protein quaternary structure, but as the analogy is not perfect, the term is used to refer to a number of different concepts in nucleic acids and is less commonly encountered. Similarly to other biomolecules such as proteins, nucleic acids have four levels of structural arrangement: primary, secondary, tertiary, and quaternary structure. Primary structure is the linear sequence of nucleotides, secondary structure involves small local folding motifs, and tertiary structure is the 3D folded shape of nucleic acid molecule. In general, quaternary structure refers to 3D interactions between multiple subunits. In the case of nucleic acids, quaternary structure refers to interactions between multiple nucleic acid molecules or between nucleic acids and proteins. Nucleic acid quaternary structure is important for understanding DNA, RNA, and gene expression because quaternary structure can impact function. For example, when DNA is packed into heterochromatin, therefore exhibiting a type of quaternary structure, gene transcription will be inhibited.

== DNA ==
DNA quaternary structure is used to refer to the binding of DNA to histones to form nucleosomes, and then their organisation into higher-order chromatin fibres. The quaternary structure of DNA strongly affects how accessible the DNA sequence is to the transcription machinery for expression of genes. DNA quaternary structure varies over time, as regions of DNA are condensed or exposed for transcription. The term has also been used to describe the hierarchical assembly of artificial nucleic acid building blocks used in DNA nanotechnology.

The quaternary structure of DNA refers to the formation of chromatin. Because the human genome is so large, DNA must be condensed into chromatin, which consists of repeating units known as nucleosomes. Nucleosomes contain DNA and proteins called histones. The nucleosome core usually contains around 146 DNA base pairs wrapped around a histone octamer. The histone octamer is made of eight total histone proteins, two of each of the following proteins: H2A, H2B, H3, and H4. Histones are primarily responsible for shaping the nucleosomes, therefore drastically contributing to chromatin structure. Histone proteins are positively-charged and therefore can interact with the negatively-charged phosphate backbone of DNA. One portion of core histone proteins, known as histone tail domains, are extremely important for keeping the nucleosome tightly wrapped and giving the nucleosome secondary and tertiary structure. This is because the histone tail domains are involved in interactions between nucleosomes. The linker histone, or H1 protein, is also involved maintaining nucleosome structure. The H1 protein has the special role of ensuring that DNA stays tightly wound.

Modifications to histone proteins and their DNA are classified as quaternary structure. Condensed chromatin, heterochromatin, prevents transcription of genes. In other words, transcription factors cannot access wound DNA- This is in contrast to euchromatin, which is decondensed, and therefore, readily accessible to the transcriptional machinery. DNA methylation to nucleotides influences chromatin quaternary structure. Highly methylated DNA nucleotides are more likely found within heterochromatin whereas unmethylated DNA nucleotides are common in euchromatin. Furthermore, post-translational modifications can be made to the core histone tail domains, which lead to changes in DNA quaternary structure and therefore gene expression. Enzymes, known as epigenetic writers and epigenetic erasers, catalyze either the addition or removal of several modifications to the histone tail domains. For instance, an enzyme writer can methylate Lysine-9 of the H3 core protein, which is found in the H3 histone tail domain. This can lead to gene repression as the chromatin gets remodeled and resembles heterochromatin. However, dozens of modifications can be made to histone tail domains. Therefore, it is the sum of all those modifications that determine whether chromatin will resemble heterochromatin or euchromatin.

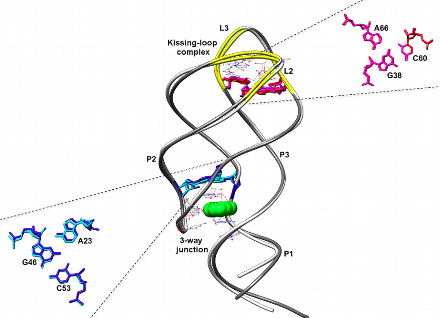
The three-dimensional folding motif known as the kissing loop. In this diagram, two kissing loop models are overlaid to show structural similarities. The white backbone and pink bases are from B. subtilis, and the gray backbone and blue bases are from V. vulnificus.

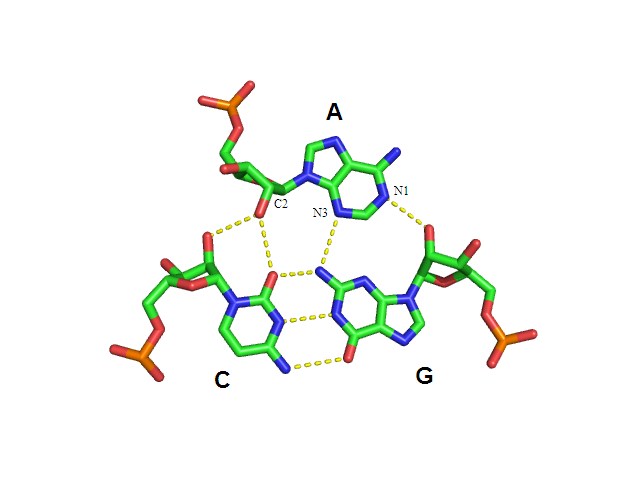
A-minor motif interaction

== RNA ==
RNA is subdivided into many categories, including messenger RNA (mRNA), ribosomal RNA (rRNA), transfer RNA (tRNA), long non-coding RNA (lncRNA), and several other small functional RNAs. Whereas many proteins have quaternary structure, the majority of RNA molecules have only primary through tertiary structure and function as individual molecules rather than as multi-subunit structures. Some types of RNA show clear quaternary structure that is essential for function, whereas other types of RNA function as single molecules and do not associate with other molecules to form quaternary structures. Symmetrical complexes of RNA molecules are extremely uncommon compared to protein oligomers. One example of an RNA homodimer is the VS ribozyme from Neurospora, with its two active sites consisting of nucleotides from both monomers. The best known example of RNA forming quaternary structures with proteins is the ribosome, which consists of multiple rRNAs, supported by rProteins. Similar RNA-Protein complexes are also found in the spliceosome.

=== Riboswitches ===
Riboswitches are a type of mRNA structure that help regulate gene expression and often bind a diverse set of ligands. Riboswitches determine how gene expression responds to varying concentrations of small molecules in the cell This motif has been observed in flavin mononucleotide (FMN), cyclic di-AMP (c-di-AMP), and glycine. Riboswitches are said to show pseudoquaternary structure. Several structurally similar regions of a single RNA molecule fold together symmetrically. Because this structure arises from a single molecule and not from multiple separate molecules, it cannot be referred to as true quaternary structure. Depending on where a riboswitch binds and how it is arranged, it can suppress or allow a gene to be expressed Symmetry is an important part of biomolecular three-dimensional configurations. Many proteins are symmetrical on the level of quaternary structure, but RNAs rarely have symmetrical quaternary structures. Even though tertiary structure is variant and essential for all types of RNAs, RNA oligimerization is relatively rare.

=== rRNA ===
Ribosomes, the organelles where protein translation takes place, are made from rRNA and ribosomal proteins. Ribosomes may be the best and most abundant example of nucleic acid quaternary structure. The specifics of ribosome structure varies among different kingdoms and species, but all ribosomes are made of a large subunit and a small subunit. Different classes of organisms have ribosomal subunits of different characteristic sizes. The three dimensional association of ribosomal subunits is essential for ribosomal function. The small subunit binds first to mRNA and then the large subunit is recruited. In order for a polypeptide to be formed, proper association of the mRNA and both ribosome subunits must occur. At left, the secondary structure of rRNA in the peptidyl transferase center of the ribosome in yeast. The peptidyl transferase center is where the formation of the peptide bond is catalyzed during translation. At right, the three-dimensional structure of the peptidyltransferase center. The helical rRNA is associated with globular ribosomal proteins. Incoming codons arrive at the A site and move to the P site, where peptide bond formation is catalyzed. One specific three dimensional structure that is commonly observed in rRNA is the A-minor motif. There are four types of A-minor motifs, all of which include many unpaired adenosines. These lone adenosines extend from outward and allow RNA molecules to bind other nucleic acids in the minor groove.

=== tRNA ===
While consensus secondary and tertiary structures have been observed in tRNAs, there has not been evidence of tRNAs creating a quaternary structure thus far. Of note, it has been observed through high resolution imaging that tRNA interacts with the quaternary structure of bacterial 70S ribosome and other proteins.

=== Other small RNAs ===
==== pRNA ====
Bacteriophage φ29 prohead RNA (pRNA) has the ability to form quaternary structure. pRNA is able to form into a quaternary structure by oligimerizing to create the capsid that encloses the genomic DNA of bacteriophage. Several molecules of pRNA surround the genome, and through stacking interactions and base pairing the pRNAs enclose and the protect the DNA. Crystallography studies show that pRNA forms tetrameric rings, although cryo-EM structures suggest pRNA may also form pentameric rings.

==== Kissing stem-loop motif ====
In the kissing stem-loop motif, a model based on Dengue virus methyltransferase, four monomers of methyltransferase surround two octamers of RNA. The nucleic acid associations demonstrate the three-dimensional folding kissing-loop motif.

In this diagram, two kissing loop models are overlaid to show structural similarities. The white backbone and pink bases are from B. subtilis, and the gray backbone and blue bases are from V. vulnificus.

The kissing loop motif has been observed in retroviruses and RNAs that are encoded by plasmids. The determination of the number of kissing loops to form the capsid varies between 5 and 6. Five kissing loops have been shown to have a stronger stability due to the particular symmetry that the 5 kissing loop structure provides.

==== Small nuclear RNA ====
Small nuclear RNA (snRNA) combines with proteins to form the spliceosome in the nucleus. The spliceosome is responsible for sensing and cutting introns out of pre-mRNA, which is one of the first steps of mRNA processing. The spliceosome is a large macromolecular complex. Quaternary structure allows snRNA to detect mRNA sequences that need to be excised.

== See also ==
- Nucleic acid structure
