= Prochloraz =

Chemical compound

Clinical data
- Trade names: Abavit, Ascurit, Dibavit, Mirage, Octave, Omega, Prelude, Rival, Sporgon, Sportak, Sprint, Tenor

Identifiers
- IUPAC name: N-propyl-N-[2-(2,4,6-trichlorophenoxy)ethyl]imidazole-1-carboxamide
- CAS Number: 67747-09-5
- PubChem CID: 73665
- ChemSpider: 159925
- UNII: 99SFL01YCL
- KEGG: C11182
- ChEBI: CHEBI:8434
- ChEMBL: ChEMBL522782
- CompTox Dashboard (EPA): DTXSID4024270
- ECHA InfoCard: 100.060.885

Chemical and physical data
- Formula: C_{15}H_{16}Cl_{3}N_{3}O_{2}
- Molar mass: 376.66 g·mol^{−1}
- 3D model (JSmol): Interactive image
- SMILES: CCCN(CCOC1=C(C=C(C=C1Cl)Cl)Cl)C(=O)N2C=CN=C2
- InChI: InChI=1S/C15H16Cl3N3O2/c1-10(2)21(15(22)20-4-3-19-9-20)5-6-23-14-12(17)7-11(16)8-13(14)18/h3-4,7-10H,5-6H2,1-2H3; Key:XJABPYGRRIVUOG-UHFFFAOYSA-N

Prochloraz, brand name Sportak, is an imidazole fungicide that was introduced in 1978 and is widely used in Europe, Australia, Asia, and South America within gardening and agriculture to control the growth of fungi. It is not registered for use in the United States.

Similarly to other azole fungicides, prochloraz is an inhibitor of the enzyme lanosterol 14α-demethylase (CYP51A1), which is necessary for the production of ergosterol – an essential component of the fungal cell membrane – from lanosterol. The agent is a broad-spectrum, protective and curative fungicide, effective against Alternaria spp., Botrytis spp., Erysiphe spp., Helminthosporium spp., Fusarium spp., Pseudocerosporella spp., Pyrenophora spp., Rhynchosporium spp., and Septoria spp.

Like many imidazole and triazole fungicides and antifungal medications, prochloraz is not particularly selective in its actions. In addition to inhibition of lanosterol 14α-demethylase, prochloraz has been found to act as an antagonist of the androgen and estrogen receptors, as an agonist of the aryl hydrocarbon receptor, and as an inhibitor of enzymes in the steroidogenesis pathway such as CYP17A1 and aromatase. In accordance, it has been shown to produce reproductive malformations in mice. As such, prochloraz is considered to be an endocrine disruptor.

== See also ==
- Ketoconazole
- Phenothrin
- Procymidone
- Vinclozolin
