= M. nivalis =

M. nivalis may refer to:

- Microtus nivalis, a vole species
- Monographella nivalis, a plant pathogen species
- Montifringilla nivalis, a small passerine bird species
- Mustela nivalis, a weasel species
- Mycosphaerella nivalis, a fungus species
