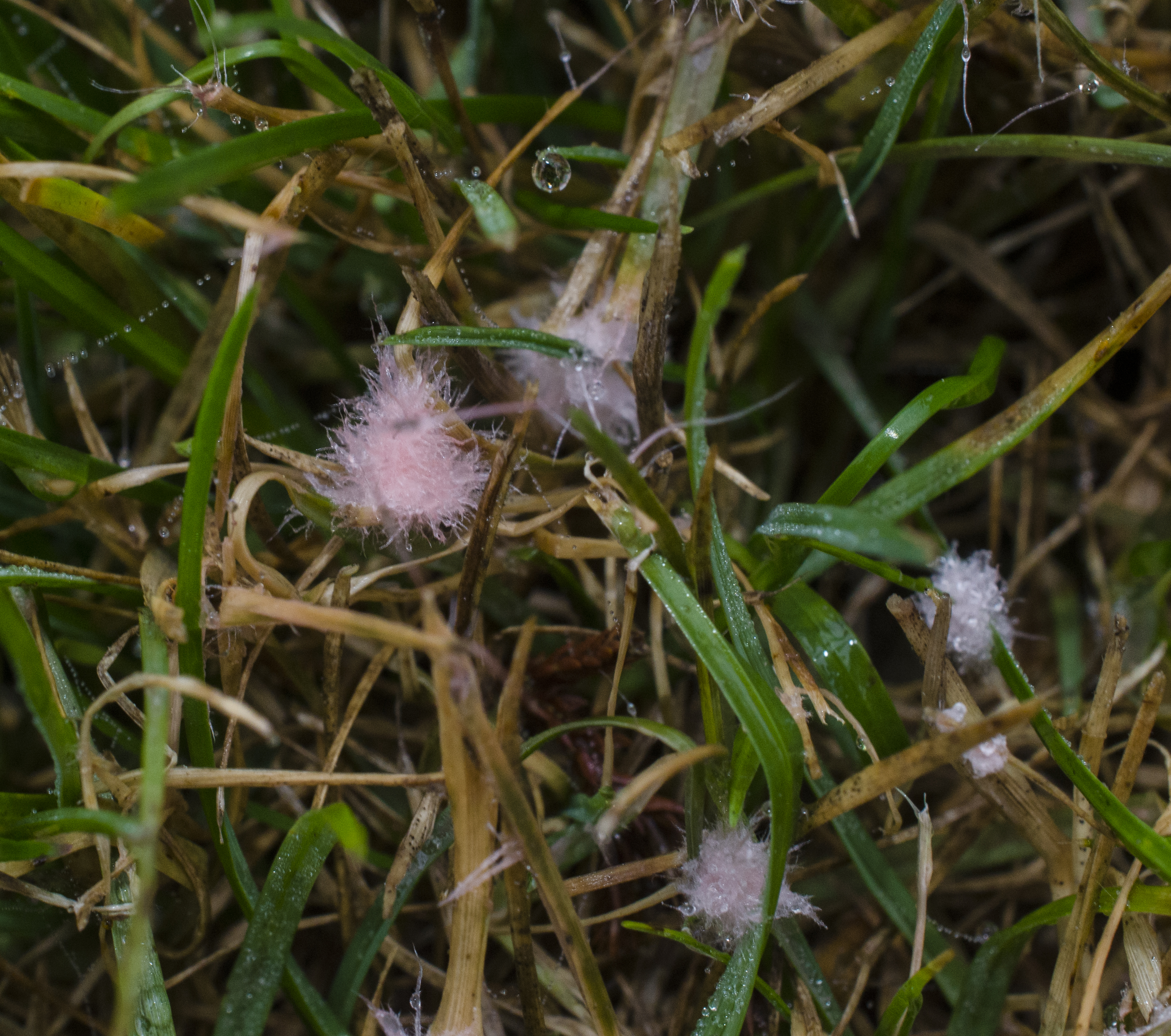

Scientific classification
- Domain: Eukaryota
- Kingdom: Fungi
- Division: Ascomycota
- Class: Sordariomycetes
- Order: Amphisphaeriales
- Family: Amphisphaeriaceae
- Genus: Microdochium; Syd. (1924)

Type species
- Microdochium phragmitis Syd. 1924

= Microdochium =

Genus of fungi

Microdochium is a genus of ascomycete fungi, which contains several plant pathogens. The teleomorph is Monographella. The genus was circumscribed by German mycologist Hans Sydow in 1924.

== Species ==
As accepted by GBIF;

- Microdochium albescens (Thüm.) Hern.-Restr. & Crous, as Monographella albescens
- Microdochium bolleyi (R.Sprague) de Hoog & Herm.-Nijh.
- Microdochium caespitosum B.Sutton, Piroz. & Deighton, affects leaves of Eucalyptus deglupta
- Microdochium chrysanthemoides Z.F.Zhang, F.Liu & L.Cai
- Microdochium citrinidiscum Hern.-Restr. & Crous
- Microdochium colombiense Hern.-Restr. & Crous
- Microdochium consociatum (Rehm) Hern.-Restr. & Crous
- Microdochium cylindricum B.Sutton & Hodges, affects leaves of Eucalyptus camaldulensis
- Microdochium fisheri Hern.-Restr. & Crous
- Microdochium fusariisporum (Ellis & Everh.) Hern.-Restr. & Crous
- Microdochium griseum B.Sutton, Piroz. & Deighton, affects leaves of Eucalyptus sideroxylon
- Microdochium intermedium (Matsush.) de Hoog & Herm.-Nijh.
- Microdochium linariae Săvul.
- Microdochium lycopodinum (Jaklitsch, Siepe & Voglmayr) Hern.-Restr. & Crous
- Microdochium majus (Wollenw.) Glynn & S.G.Edwards
- Microdochium maydis (E.Müll. & Samuels) Hern.-Restr. & Crous
- Microdochium nivale (Fr.) Samuels & I.C.Hallett, as Monographella nivalis var. nivalis, Pink snow.
- Microdochium novae-zelandiae, Hern.-Restr., Thangavel & Crous
- Microdochium opuntiae (Ellis & Everh.) Hern.-Restr. & Crous
- Microdochium palmicola Hol.-Jech. & Mercado
- Microdochium panattonianum (Berl.) B.Sutton, Galea & T.V.Price
- Microdochium paspali Wu Zhang bis, Nan & Mei J.Hu
- Microdochium passiflorae Samuels, E.Müll. & Petrini
- Microdochium phragmitis Syd. & P.Syd.
- Microdochium phyllanthi B.Sutton, Piroz. & Deighton
- Microdochium punctum (Davis) U.Braun
- Microdochium queenslandicum Matsush.
- Microdochium rhopalostylidis Crous & R.Thangavel
- Microdochium sclerotiorum Mouch. & Samson
- Microdochium seminicola Hern.-Restr., Seifert, R.M.Clear & B.Dorn
- Microdochium stevensonii (Petr.) Hern.-Restr. & Crous
- Microdochium stoveri (C.Booth) Samuels & I.C.Hallett
- Microdochium tainanense (Ts.Watan.) de Hoog & Herm.-Nijh.
- Microdochium trichocladiopsis Hern.-Restr. & Crous
- Microdochium triticicola Kwaśna & G.L.Bateman

Note Microdochium dimerum is now a synonym for Bisifusarium dimerum (Penz.) L.Lombard & Crous
