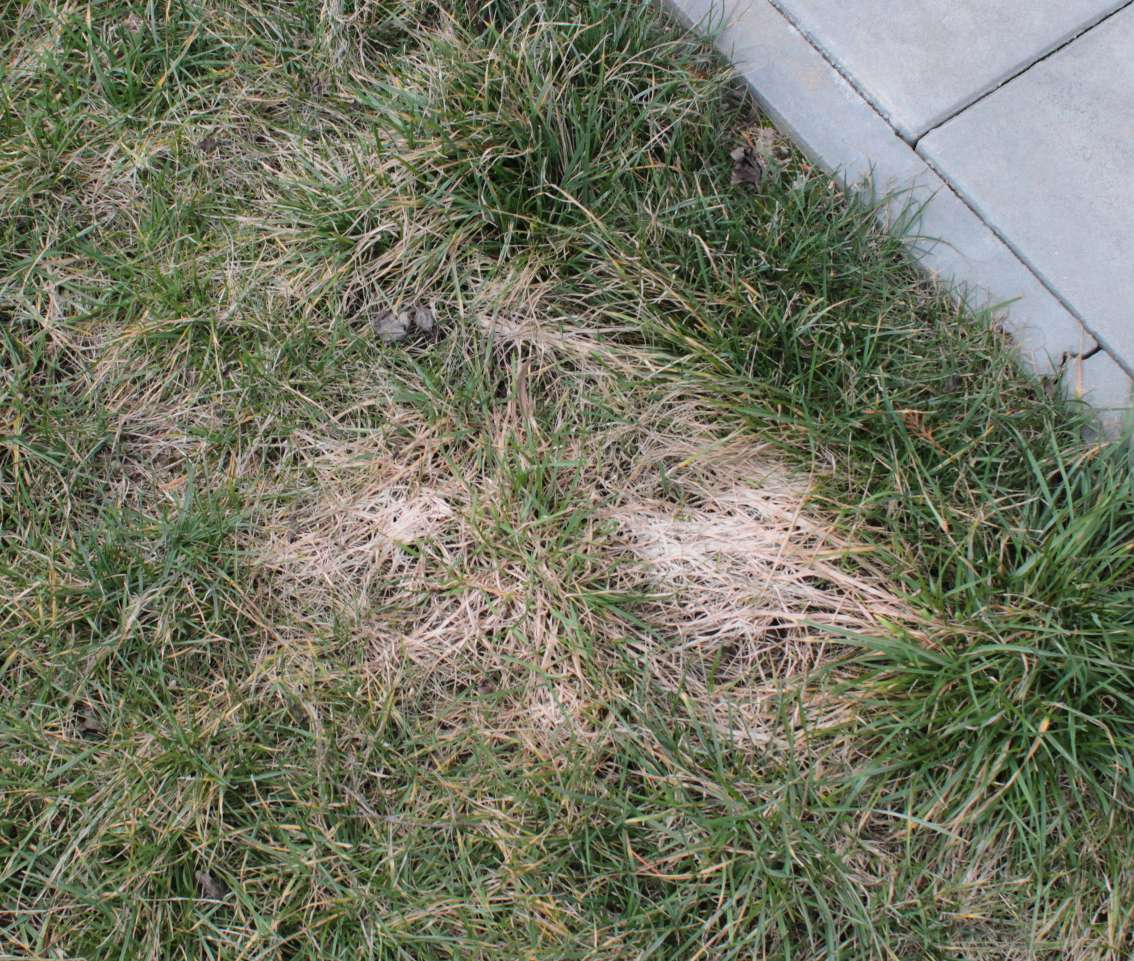
- Monographella nivalis, spring 2013

Scientific classification
- Kingdom: Fungi
- Division: Ascomycota
- Class: Sordariomycetes
- Order: Amphisphaeriales
- Family: Hyponectriaceae
- Genus: Monographella; Petr.

Type species
- Monographella divergens (Rehm) Petr.

Species
- Species include: Monographella albescens; Monographella cucumerina; Monographella divergens; Monographella nivalis var. neglecta; Monographella nivalis var. nivalis

= Monographella =

Genus of fungi

Monographella is a genus of fungi in the family Hyponectriaceae. The anamorph is Microdochium.
