= Dermatosis neglecta =

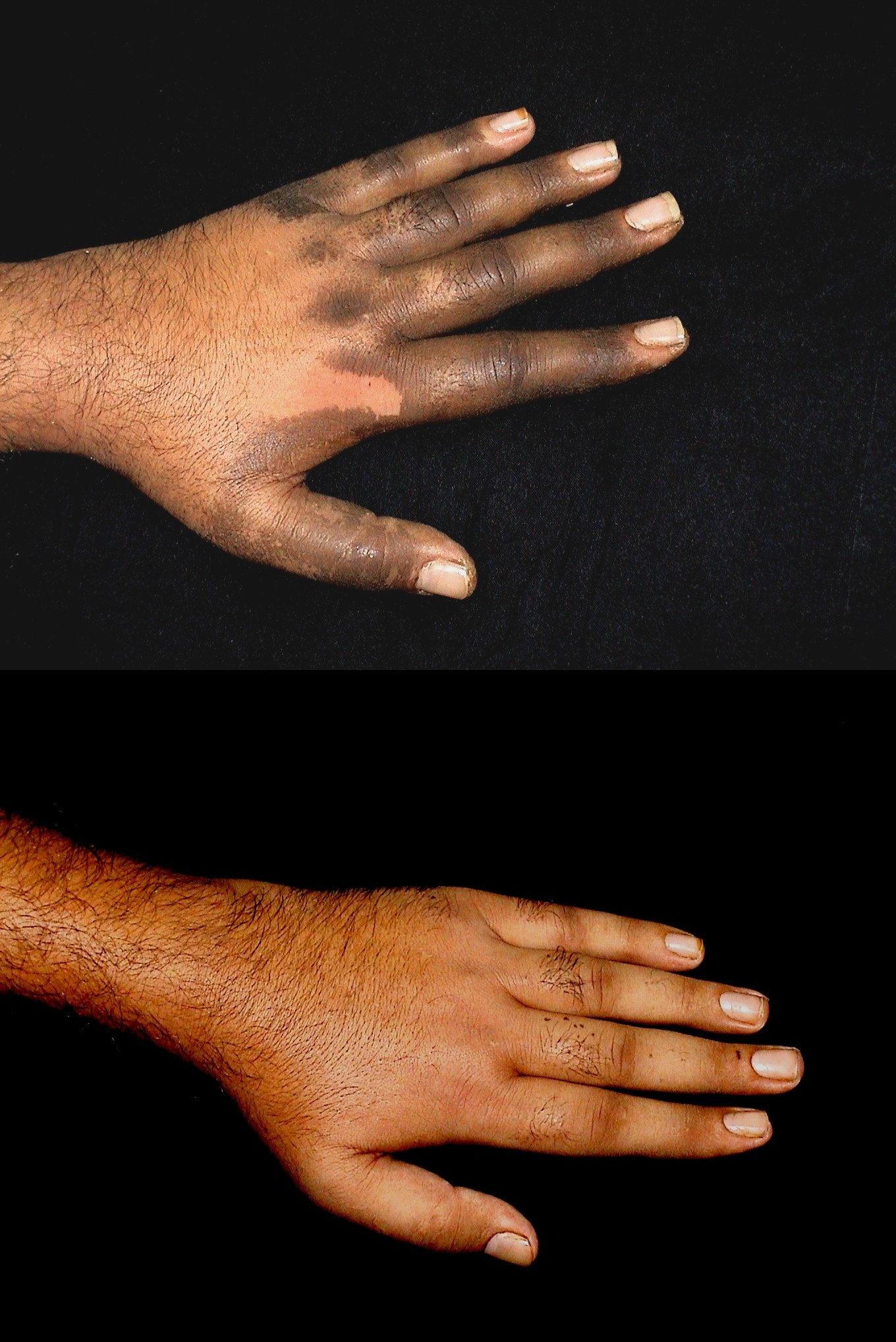
- A 35-year-old male, with multiple fractures, neurological deficit and immobility sustained in a fall, leading to the development of dermatosis neglecta of the left hand. Upper image: Dorsum of hand (at presentation). Lower image: Dorsum of hand (after two weeks).
- Specialty: Dermatology

Dermatosis neglecta is a skin condition in which accumulation of sebum, keratin, sweat, dirt and debris leads to a localized patch of skin discoloration or a wart-like plaque. It is caused by inadequate hygiene of a certain body part, usually due to some form of disability or a condition that is associated with pain or increased sensitivity to touch (hyperesthesia) or immobility.

Dermatosis neglecta typically develops several months after a disability or other affliction leads to improper cleaning. Patients may deny that negligence is the cause of the lesion, even though it completely resolves on vigorous rubbing with alcohol swabs or water and soap (which provides both diagnosis and treatment). Recognizing the diagnosis avoids unnecessary skin biopsies.

== Diagnosis ==
Many other conditions can lead to localized scaling or hyperpigmentation.

This condition should firmly be distinguished from dermatitis artefacta, which is the factitious creation of a skin lesion, whereas dermatosis neglecta results from unconscious avoidance of cleaning due to pain or immobility.

Other skin conditions which should not be mistaken for dermatosis neglecta include: terra firma-forme dermatosis (in which there is no history of inadequate cleaning); confluent and reticulated papillomatosis of Gougerot and Carteaud; several forms of ichthyosis; acanthosis nigricans; and Vagabond's disease.

== History ==
The term was first coined by Poskitt and coworkers in 1995.

Examples of case reports from the literature include a man who avoided washing the skin area surrounding an artificial pacemaker out of fear it might be damaged; a woman who didn't clean the right side of her chest due to hyperesthesia following an amputation for breast cancer (mastectomy); a girl who was afraid to wash the area around an abdominal scar; and a man with multiple fractures, shoulder dislocation and radial nerve palsy which significantly reduced his mobility.
