= Methyl vinyl ketone =

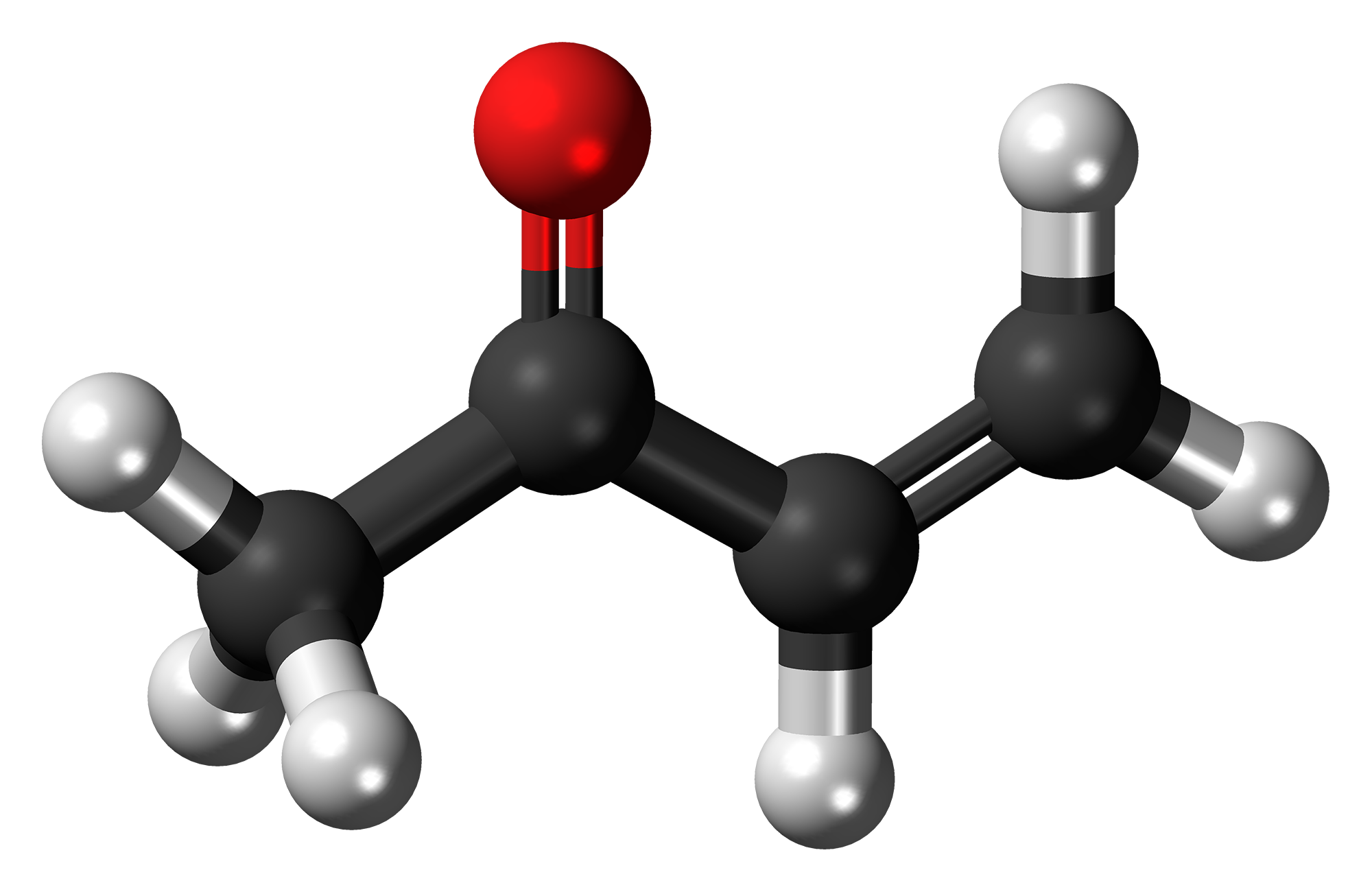

Names
- Preferred IUPAC name But-3-en-2-one
- Other names MVK; Methylene acetone

Identifiers
| CAS Number | 78-94-4 |
| 3D model (JSmol) | Interactive image |
| ChEBI | CHEBI:48058 |
| ChemSpider | 6322 |
| ECHA InfoCard | 100.001.055 |
| PubChem CID | 6570 |
| UNII | AR7642I1MP |
| CompTox Dashboard (EPA) | DTXSID3025671 |
- InChI: InChI=1S/C4H6O/c1-3-4(2)5/h3H,1H2,2H3 Key: FUSUHKVFWTUUBE-UHFFFAOYSA-N; InChI=1/C4H6O/c1-3-4(2)5/h3H,1H2,2H3 Key: FUSUHKVFWTUUBE-UHFFFAOYAV
- SMILES: CC(=O)C=C

Properties
| Chemical formula | C_{4}H_{6}O |
| Molar mass | 70.09 g/mol |
| Density | 0.8407 g/cm^{3} |
| Melting point | −7 °C (19 °F; 266 K) |
| Boiling point | 81.4 °C (178.5 °F; 354.5 K) |

Hazards
- GHS labelling
| Pictograms | (GHS06: Toxic) (GHS07: Exclamation mark) (GHS02: Flammable) (GHS08: Health hazard) (GHS09: Environmental hazard) |
| Signal word | Danger |
| NFPA 704 (fire diamond) | 4 3 2 |
| Flash point | −7 °C (19 °F; 266 K) |
| Autoignition temperature | 370 °C (698 °F; 643 K) |
| Explosive limits | 2.1% v/v (lower), 15.6% v/v (higher) |
| Safety data sheet (SDS) | Fisher Scientific |
- Except where otherwise noted, data are given for materials in their standard state (at 25 °C [77 °F], 100 kPa). verify (what is ?) Infobox references

Methyl vinyl ketone (MVK, IUPAC name: butenone) is the organic compound with the formula CH_{3}C(O)CH=CH_{2}. It is a highly reactive compound. It is the simplest enone. It is a colorless, flammable, highly toxic liquid with a pungent odor. It is soluble in water and polar organic solvents. It is a useful intermediate in the synthesis of organic compounds.

== Production ==
MVK has been prepared industrially by the condensation of acetone and formaldehyde, followed by dehydration. Similarly it is prepared by the Mannich reaction involving diethylammonium chloride and acetone, which produces the Mannich adduct:

CH_{3}C(O)CH_{3} + CH_{2}O + [H_{2}NEt_{2}]Cl → [CH_{3}C(O)CH_{2}CH_{2}N(H)Et_{2}]Cl + H_{2}O

Heating this ammonium salt releases the ammonium chloride and the MVK:

[CH_{3}C(O)CH_{2}CH_{2}N(H)Et_{2}]Cl → CH_{3}C(O)CH=CH_{2} + [H_{2}NEt_{2}]Cl

== Reactivity and applications ==
MVK can act as an alkylating agent because it is an effective Michael acceptor. It gained early attention for its use in the Robinson annulation, a method useful in the preparation of steroids:

Robinson annulation reaction

Its alkylating ability is both the source of its high toxicity and the feature that makes it a useful intermediate in organic synthesis. MVK will polymerize spontaneously. The compound is typically stored with hydroquinone, which inhibits polymerization.

Vinclozolin is a commercial fungicide prepared using MVK.

As an electrophilic alkene, it forms an adduct with cyclopentadiene. The resulting norbornene derivative is an intermediate in the synthesis of the anticholinergic drug biperiden. Via its cyanohydrin is also a precursor to vinclozolin. It is also a precursor to synthetic vitamin A. MVK is used in the synthesis of Wieland–Miescher ketone.

== Safety ==
MVK is extremely hazardous upon inhalation with an LD50 (rats) on the order of milligrams per cubic meter.
