= Protein quaternary structure =

Number and arrangement of multiple folded protein subunits in a multi-subunit complex

The image above contains clickable links This diagram (which is interactive) of protein structure uses PCNA as an example. (PDB: 1AXC)

Protein quaternary structure (Note: Here quaternary means "fourth-level structure", not "four-way interaction". Etymologically quartary is correct: quaternary is derived from Latin distributive numbers, and follows binary and ternary; while quartary is derived from Latin ordinal numbers, and follows secondary and tertiary. However, quaternary is standard in biology.) is the fourth (and highest) classification level of protein structure. Protein quaternary structure refers to the structure of proteins which are themselves composed of two or more smaller protein chains (also referred to as subunits). Protein quaternary structure describes the number and arrangement of multiple folded protein subunits in a multi-subunit complex. It includes organizations from simple dimers to large homooligomers and complexes with defined or variable numbers of subunits. In contrast to the first three levels of protein structure, not all proteins will have a quaternary structure since some proteins function as single units. Protein quaternary structure can also refer to biomolecular complexes of proteins with nucleic acids and other cofactors.

== Description and examples ==
Many proteins are actually assemblies of multiple polypeptide chains. The quaternary structure refers to the number and arrangement of the protein subunits with respect to one another. Examples of proteins with quaternary structure include hemoglobin, DNA polymerase, ribosomes, antibodies, and ion channels.

Enzymes composed of subunits with diverse functions are sometimes called holoenzymes, in which some parts may be known as regulatory subunits and the functional core is known as the catalytic subunit. Other assemblies referred to instead as multiprotein complexes also possess quaternary structure. Examples include nucleosomes and microtubules. Changes in quaternary structure can occur through conformational changes within individual subunits or through reorientation of the subunits relative to each other. It is through such changes, which underlie cooperativity and allostery in "multimeric" enzymes, that many proteins undergo regulation and perform their physiological function.

The above definition follows a classical approach to biochemistry, established at times when the distinction between a protein and a functional, proteinaceous unit was difficult to elucidate. More recently, people refer to protein–protein interaction when discussing quaternary structure of proteins and consider all assemblies of proteins as protein complexes.

== Nomenclature ==
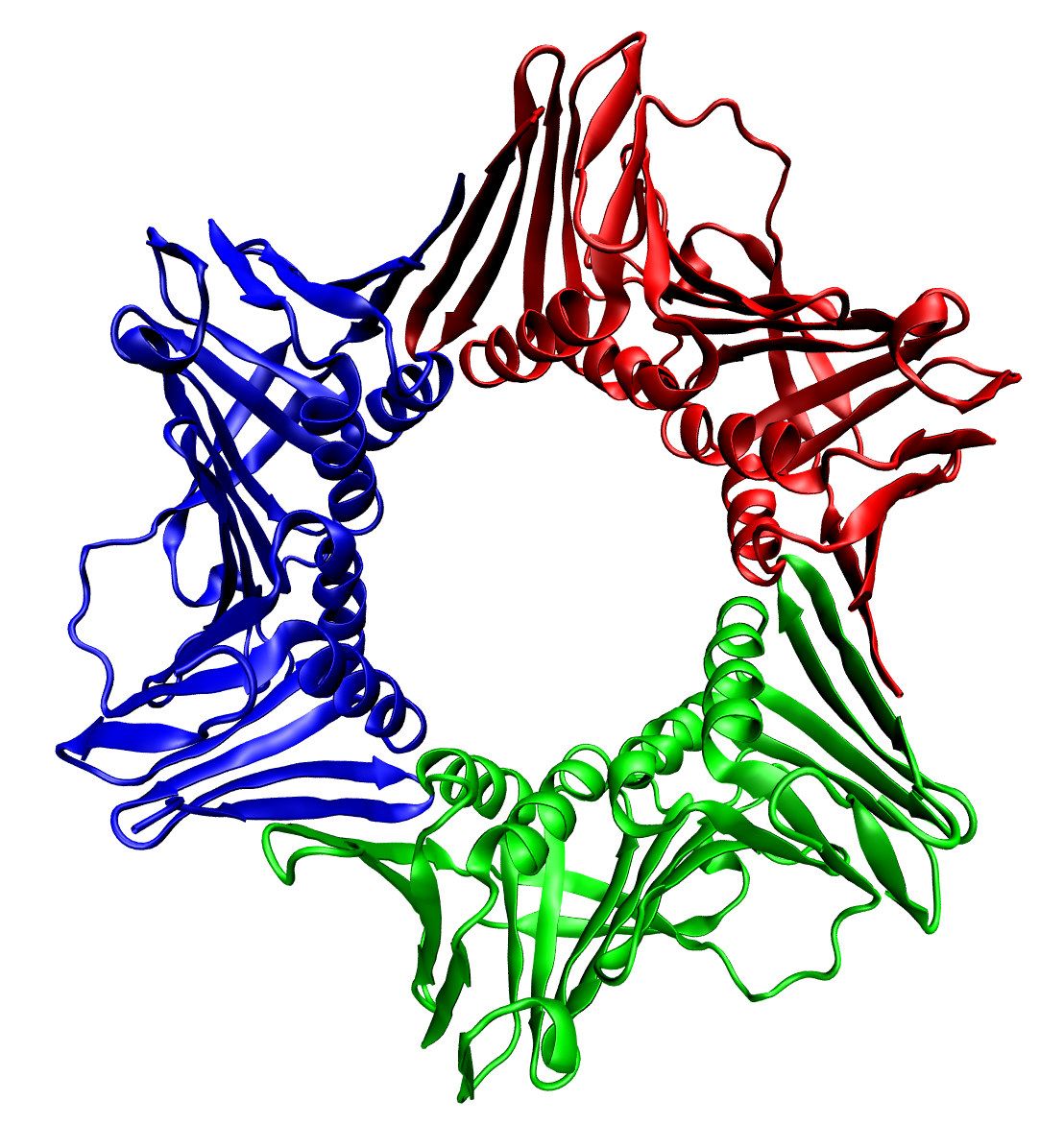
The quaternary structure of this protein complex would be described as a homo-trimer because it is composed of three identical smaller protein subunits (also designated as monomers or protomers).

The number of subunits in an oligomeric complex is described using names that end in -mer (Greek for "part, subunit"). Formal and Greco-Latinate names are generally used for the first ten types and can be used for up to twenty subunits, whereas higher order complexes are usually described by the number of subunits, followed by -meric.

- 1 = monomer
- 2 = dimer
- 3 = trimer
- 4 = tetramer
- 5 = pentamer
- 6 = hexamer
- 7 = heptamer
- 8 = octamer
- 9 = nonamer
- 10 = decamer
- 11 = undecamer
- 12 = dodecamer
- 13 = tridecamer
- 14 = tetradecamer
- 15 = pentadecamer*
- 16 = hexadecamer
- 17 = heptadecamer*
- 18 = octadecamer
- 19 = nonadecamer
- 20 = eicosamer
- 21 = 21-mer
- 22 = 22-mer
- 23 = 23-mer*
- etc.

*No known examples

The smallest unit forming a homo-oligomer, i.e. one protein chain or subunit, is designated as a monomer, subunit or protomer. The latter term was originally devised to specify the smallest unit of hetero-oligomeric proteins, but is also applied to homo-oligomeric proteins in current literature. The subunits usually arrange in cyclic symmetry to form closed point group symmetries.

Although complexes higher than octamers are rarely observed for most proteins, there are some important exceptions. Viral capsids are often composed of multiples of 60 proteins. Several molecular machines are also found in the cell, such as the proteasome (four heptameric rings = 28 subunits), the transcription complex and the spliceosome. The ribosome is probably the largest molecular machine, and is composed of many RNA and protein molecules.

In some cases, proteins form complexes that then assemble into even larger complexes. In such cases, one uses the nomenclature, e.g., "dimer of dimers" or "trimer of dimers". This may suggest that the complex might dissociate into smaller sub-complexes before dissociating into monomers. This usually implies that the complex consists of different oligomerisation interfaces. For example, a tetrameric protein may have one four-fold rotation axis, i.e. point group symmetry 4 or C_{4}. In this case the four interfaces between the subunits are identical. It may also have point group symmetry 222 or D_{2}. This tetramer has different interfaces and the tetramer can dissociate into two identical homodimers. Tetramers of 222 symmetry are "dimer of dimers". Hexamers of 32 point group symmetry are "trimer of dimers" or "dimer of trimers". Thus, the nomenclature "dimer of dimers" is used to specify the point group symmetry or arrangement of the oligomer, independent of information relating to its dissociation properties.

Another distinction often made when referring to oligomers is whether they are homomeric or heteromeric, referring to whether the smaller protein subunits that come together to make the protein complex are the same (homomeric) or different (heteromeric) from each other. For example, two identical protein monomers would come together to form a homo-dimer, whereas two different protein monomers would create a hetero-dimer.

== Structure determination ==
Protein quaternary structure can be determined using a variety of experimental techniques that require a sample of protein in a variety of experimental conditions. The experiments often provide an estimate of the mass of the native protein and, together with knowledge of the masses and/or stoichiometry of the subunits, allow the quaternary structure to be predicted with a given accuracy. It is not always possible to obtain a precise determination of the subunit composition for a variety of reasons.

The number of subunits in a protein complex can often be determined by measuring the hydrodynamic molecular volume or mass of the intact complex, which requires native solution conditions. For folded proteins, the mass can be inferred from its volume using the partial specific volume of 0.73 ml/g. However, volume measurements are less certain than mass measurements, since unfolded proteins appear to have a much larger volume than folded proteins; additional experiments are required to determine whether a protein is unfolded or has formed an oligomer.

=== Common study techniques ===
- Ultracentrifugation
- Surface-induced dissociation mass spectrometry
- Coimmunoprecipation
- FRET
- Nuclear Magnetic Resonance (NMR)

=== Direct mass measurement of intact complexes ===
- Sedimentation-equilibrium analytical ultracentrifugation
- Electrospray mass spectrometry
- Mass Spectrometric Immunoassay MSIA

=== Direct size measurement of intact complexes ===
- Static light scattering
- Size exclusion chromatography (requires calibration)
- Dual polarisation interferometry

=== Indirect size measurement of intact complexes ===
- Sedimentation-velocity analytical ultracentrifugation (measures the translational diffusion constant)
- Dynamic light scattering (measures the translational diffusion constant)
- Pulsed-gradient protein nuclear magnetic resonance (measures the translational diffusion constant)
- Fluorescence polarization (measures the rotational diffusion constant)
- Dielectric relaxation (measures the rotational diffusion constant)
- Dual polarisation interferometry (measures the size and the density of the complex)

Methods that measure the mass or volume under unfolding conditions (such as MALDI-TOF mass spectrometry and SDS-PAGE) are generally not useful, since non-native conditions usually cause the complex to dissociate into monomers. However, these may sometimes be applicable; for example, the experimenter may apply SDS-PAGE after first treating the intact complex with chemical cross-link reagents.

== Structure prediction ==
Some bioinformatics methods have been developed for predicting the quaternary structural attributes of proteins based on their sequence information by using various modes of pseudo amino acid composition.

Protein folding prediction programs used to predict protein tertiary structure have also been expanding to better predict protein quaternary structure. One such development is AlphaFold-Multimer built upon the AlphaFold model for predicting protein tertiary structure.

== Role in cell signaling ==
Protein quaternary structure also plays an important role in certain cell signaling pathways. The G protein-coupled receptor pathway involves a heterotrimeric protein known as a G protein. G proteins contain three distinct subunits known as the G-alpha, G-beta, and G-gamma subunits. When the G protein is activated, it binds to the G protein-coupled receptor protein and the cell signaling pathway is initiated. Another example is the receptor tyrosine kinase (RTK) pathway, which is initiated by the dimerization of two receptor tyrosine kinase monomers. When the dimer is formed, the two kinases can phosphorylate each other and initiate a cell signaling pathway.

== Protein–protein interactions ==
Proteins are capable of forming very tight but also only transient complexes. For example, ribonuclease inhibitor binds to ribonuclease A with a roughly 20 fM dissociation constant. Other proteins have evolved to bind specifically to unusual moieties on another protein, e.g., biotin groups (avidin), phosphorylated tyrosines (SH2 domains) or proline-rich segments (SH3 domains). Protein–protein interactions can be engineered to favor certain oligomerization states.

== Intragenic complementation ==
When multiple copies of a polypeptide encoded by a gene form a quaternary complex, this protein structure is referred to as a multimer. When a multimer is formed from polypeptides produced by two different mutant alleles of a particular gene, the mixed multimer may exhibit greater functional activity than the unmixed multimers formed by each of the mutants alone. In such a case, the phenomenon is referred to as intragenic complementation (also called inter-allelic complementation). Intragenic complementation appears to be common and has been studied in many different genes in a variety of organisms including the fungi Neurospora crassa, Saccharomyces cerevisiae and Schizosaccharomyces pombe; the bacterium Salmonella typhimurium; the virus bacteriophage T4, an RNA virus, and humans. The intermolecular forces likely responsible for self-recognition and multimer formation were discussed by Jehle.

== Assembly ==
Direct interaction of two nascent proteins emerging from nearby ribosomes appears to be a general mechanism for oligomer formation. Hundreds of protein oligomers were identified that assemble in human cells by such an interaction. The most prevalent form of interaction was between the N-terminal regions of the interacting proteins. Dimer formation appears to be able to occur independently of dedicated assembly machines.

== See also ==
- Biomolecular complex
- Multiprotein complex
- Nucleic acid quaternary structure
- Oligomers
- Structural biology
