= Dicarboximide fungicides =

Chemical structure of vinclozolin, a dicarboximide fungicide

Dicarboximide (or dicarboxamide) fungicides are a family of agricultural fungicides that include vinclozolin, iprodione, and procymidone. Dicarboximides are believed to inhibit triglyceride biosynthesis in sclerotia-forming fungi, including Botrytis cinerea. These fungicides turn into 3,5-dichloroaniline in soil rapidly. Repeated use of dicarboximides over several years reduce their effectiveness. Resistance has developed against all dicarboximides in many plant species, including vines, strawberries and protected crops, and are recommended to be used in conjunction with other fungicides.

== Toxicity ==
Dicarboximides are endocrine disruptors and have been shown to have antiandrogenic effects, i.e. decrease levels of male hormones.

Animal studies with vinclozolin and procymidone show irregular reproductive development due to their function as androgen receptor antagonists that inhibit androgen-activated gene expression. Even with low doses of antiandrogenic pesticides, developmental effects such as reduced anogenital distance and induction of areolas were seen in male rats.
