= Eicosameric =

Protein complexes or biological polymers with 20 subunits or monomers

Eicosameric refers to biological polymers or multimers having exactly twenty 'monomers' (or 20 repeating components).

Protein complexes having exactly 20 subunits are referred to as eicosameric (or sometimes 20-Meric).

Examples of eicosameric protein complexes include;

- The rat GTPCHI/GFRP stimulatory complex (involved in regulating sub cellular signalling cascades) PDB: 1is7

== See also ==
- Protein quaternary structure
