= PRNA =

PRNA may refer to:

- NoRC associated RNA, a non-coding RNA element which regulates ribosomal RNA transcription
- Tryptophan 7-halogenase, an enzyme
