= Monographella nivalis var. neglecta =

Scientific classification
- Kingdom: Fungi
- Division: Ascomycota
- Class: Sordariomycetes
- Order: Xylariales
- Family: incertae sedis
- Genus: Monographella
- Variety: M. nivalis var. neglecta

Trinomial name
- Monographella nivalis var. neglecta (Krampe) Gerlach, (1980)

Synonyms
- Calonectria graminicola var. neglecta Krampe, (1926)

Variety of fungus

Monographella nivalis var. neglecta is a plant pathogen.
