= Microdochium bolleyi =

Scientific classification
- Domain: Eukaryota
- Kingdom: Fungi
- Division: Ascomycota
- Class: Sordariomycetes
- Order: Amphisphaeriales
- Family: Amphisphaeriaceae
- Genus: Microdochium
- Species: M. bolleyi

Binomial name
- Microdochium bolleyi (R. Sprague) de Hoog & Herm.-Nijh., (1977)

Synonyms
- Aureobasidium bolleyi (R. Sprague) (1957); Gloeosporium bolleyi R. Sprague, (1948); Idriella bolleyi (R. Sprague) (1981)

Species of fungus

Microdochium bolleyi is a fungal plant pathogen that causes root rot in flax and wheat.
