= Pyrrolnitrin =

Names
- Preferred IUPAC name 3-Chloro-4-(3-chloro-2-nitrophenyl)-1H-pyrrole

Identifiers
CAS Number	1018-71-9
3D model (JSmol)	Interactive image
ChEBI	CHEBI:32079
ChemSpider	13314
ECHA InfoCard	100.012.557
EC Number	213-812-7
KEGG	D01094
MeSH	D011764
PubChem CID	13916
UNII	N0P24B6EDQ
CompTox Dashboard (EPA)	DTXSID9046867
- InChI: InChI=1S/C10H6Cl2N2O2/c11-8-3-1-2-6(10(8)14(15)16)7-4-13-5-9(7)12/h1-5,13H Key: QJBZDBLBQWFTPZ-UHFFFAOYSA-N; InChI=1/C10H6Cl2N2O2/c11-8-3-1-2-6(10(8)14(15)16)7-4-13-5-9(7)12/h1-5,13H Key: QJBZDBLBQWFTPZ-UHFFFAOYAG
- SMILES: C1=CC(=C(C(=C1)Cl)[N+](=O)[O-])C2=CNC=C2Cl

Properties
Chemical formula	C_{10}H_{6}Cl_{2}N_{2}O_{2}
Molar mass	257.07284

Pharmacology
ATC code	D01AA07 (WHO)
- Except where otherwise noted, data are given for materials in their standard state (at 25 °C [77 °F], 100 kPa). verify (what is ?) Infobox references

Pyrrolnitrin (PRN) is a naturally occurring phenylpyrrole fungicide. Pseudomonas and Burkholderia species produce pyrrolnitrin from tryptophan as secondary metabolite. It is believed that the antifungal properties come from inhibition of electron transport system.

The synthetic fungicides fenpiclonil and fludioxonil are chemically related to pyrrolnitrin.

== Biosynthesis ==
In Pseudomonas fluorescens, biosynthesis of pyrrolnitrin requires four genes, named prnABCD, arranged into a single operon. The products of these genes are similar in size and catalyze four subsequent reactions:

- prnA – chlorination of L-tryptophan to 7-chloro-L-tryptophan (7-CLT), in a process requiring NAD
- prnB – ring rearrangement and decarboxylation of 7-chloro-L-tryptophan to form monodechloroaminopyrrolnitrin (MAD)
- prnC – chlorination of monodechloroaminopyrrolnitrin to form aminopyrrolnitrin (APRN), in a process also requiring NAD
- prnD – oxidation of the amino group of APRN to a nitro group thus completing the biosynthesis of pyrrolnitrin.

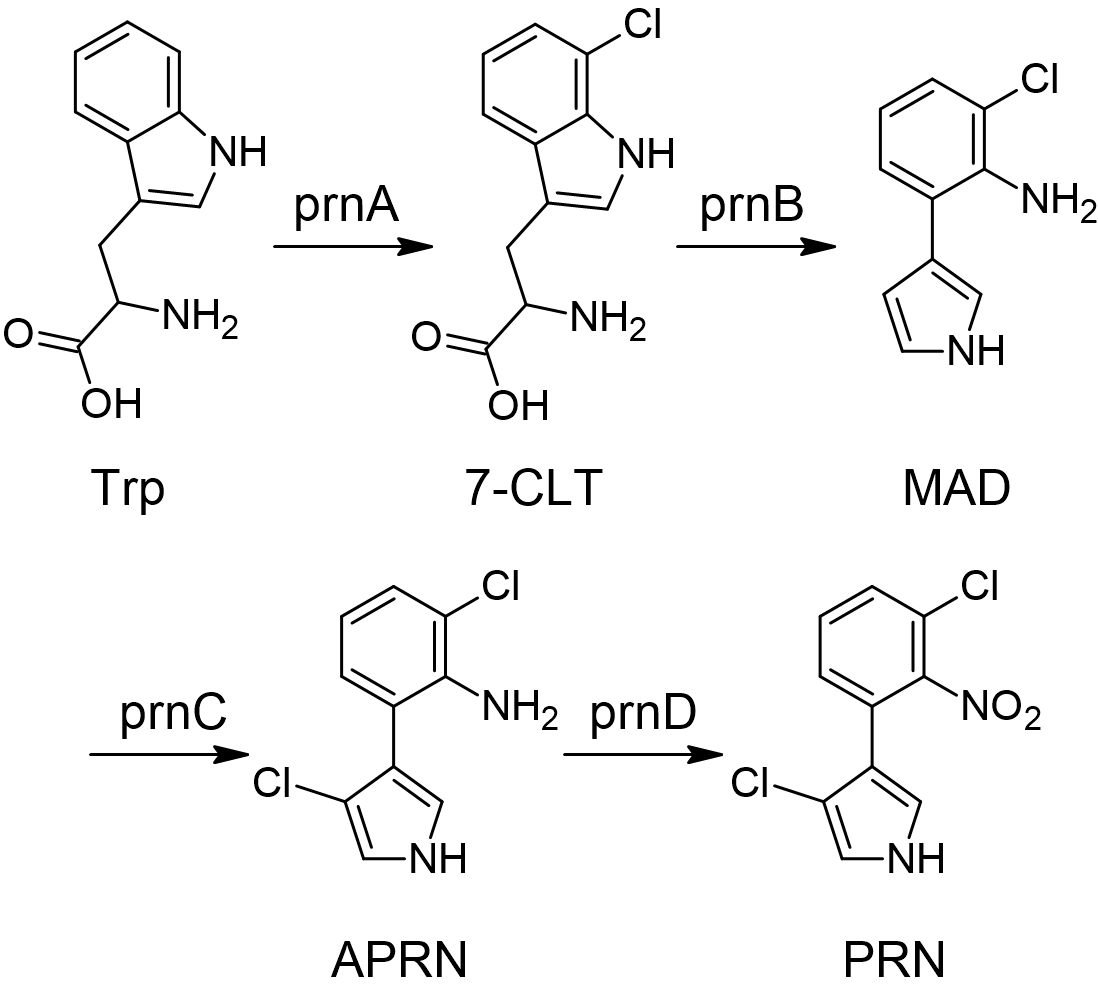
Pyrrolnitrin biosynthesis

Except for prnA, these enzymes are unable to act on D-tryptophan.

Neither of the chlorinating enzymes, prnA nor prnC, show homology to known haloperoxidases nor to one another.

An alternative pathway was also suggested, where L-tryptophan is first turned into aminophenylpyrrole (APP) and then by subsequent steps to aminopyrrolnitrin and pyrrolnitrin. While these steps have not been described in more detail, prnB is able to produce APP, presumably from tryptophan as starting material. APP seems to be an unwanted side product. The gene coding for prnB also starts with the unusual GTG start codon, further lowering the amount of prnB expressed and thus lowering the amount of present APP.
