= Dermatitis artefacta =

- Other names: Factitious dermatitis
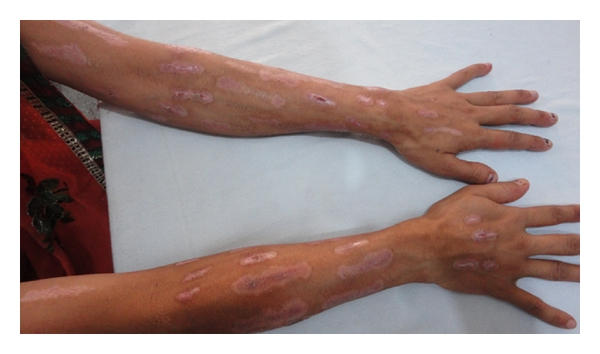
- Factitious dermatitis
- Specialty: Dermatology

Dermatitis artefacta, also known as Factitious dermatitis, is a form of factitious disorder in which patients will intentionally feign symptoms and produce signs of disease in an attempt to assume the patient role. It is also self-inflicted skin damage, most commonly from prolonged deliberate scratching, but sometimes by means of sharp instruments or another agency.

== Signs and symptoms ==
The cutaneous lesions that are commonly seen are unusual, resembling numerous recognized inflammatory responses in the skin. When a false history is given, it is typically "hollow," with no explanation of how specific skin lesions that develop on easily accessible areas suddenly become fully formed.

== Causes ==
Inducing lesions is a psychological strategy used by the patient to satiate an internal need, most commonly the desire for attention or care. Several psychosocial difficulties, emotional immaturity, unconscious motives, and dysfunctional interpersonal relationships have all been identified as etiological factors.

== Treatment ==
Topical antibiotics may be necessary to treat the skin lesions, but if a serious infection is present, oral antibiotics may also be necessary in certain situations. It is necessary to identify and treat the underlying mental health condition. Medications used frequently include sedatives, antipsychotics, and antidepressants.

== See also ==
- Factitious disorder
- List of cutaneous conditions
