= Monographella albescens =

Scientific classification
- Domain: Eukaryota
- Kingdom: Fungi
- Division: Ascomycota
- Class: Sordariomycetes
- Order: Amphisphaeriales
- Family: Amphisphaeriaceae
- Genus: Monographella
- Species: M. albescens

Binomial name
- Monographella albescens (Thüm.) V.O. Parkinson, Sivan. & C. Booth, (1981)

Synonyms
- Gerlachia oryzae (Hashioka & Yokogi) W. Gams, (1980); Griphosphaerella albescens (Thüm.) Arx, (1981); Metasphaeria albescens Thüm., (1889); Metasphaeria oryzae-sativae Hara, (1918); Microdochium oryzae (Hashioka & Yokogi) Samuels & I.C. Hallett, (1983); Micronectriella pavgii R.A. Singh, (1978); Rhynchosporium oryzae Hashioka & Yokogi, (1955)

Species of fungus

Monographella albescens is a fungal plant pathogen also known as leaf scald which infects rice.

== Transmission ==
Conidia are transferred by water splash.

== Host resistance ==
Lines of rice that are resistant against M. albescens are available. Most resistance breeding has been in field trials in countries where the disease is already widespread. Even in "resistant" strains, however, there is some noticeable lesioning but little to no loss of yield. The mechanism of resistance remains unknown. There is wide variation in pathogen strain-host strain pathogenicity.

Rice plants fed increased silicon showed increased resistance to M. albescens. Surprisingly this is not - or not entirely - due to its structural role but also due to increased production of various compounds and enzymes.
