= Phenylpyrrole =

- 1-Phenylpyrrole

- 2-Phenylpyrrole

- 3-Phenylpyrrole

Identifiers
- Compounds; 1: 1-Phenylpyrrole; 2: 2-Phenylpyrrole; 3: 3-Phenylpyrrole
CAS Number	1: 635-90-5; 2: 3042-22-6; 3: 27649-43-0
3D model (JSmol)	1: Interactive image; 2: Interactive image; 3: Interactive image
PubChem CID	1: 12480; 2: 72898; 3: 5324110
- SMILES: 1: C1=CC=C(C=C1)N2C=CC=C2; 2: C1=CC=C(C=C1)C2=CC=CN2; 3: C1=CC=C(C=C1)C2=CNC=C2

Properties
Chemical formula	C_{10}H_{9}N
Molar mass	143.189 g·mol^{−1}
- Except where otherwise noted, data are given for materials in their standard state (at 25 °C [77 °F], 100 kPa). Infobox references

Phenylpyrroles are a group of chemical compounds in which a phenyl group is attached to a pyrrole ring. The parent compounds are the structural isomers 1-phenylpyrrole (also known as N-phenylpyrrole), 2-phenylpyrrole, and 3-phenylpyrrole. Each has the molecular formula C_{10}H_{9}N. Derivatives of these isomers have a variety of uses.

== Phenylpyrrole fungicides ==
Phenylpyrrole fungicides are a class of agricultural pesticides that are chemical analogs of pyrrolnitrin, a secondary metabolite originally isolated from the bacterium Pseudomonas pyrrocinia. The principal commercial fungicides of this type are fenpiclonil and fludioxonil, both 3-phenylpyrrole derivatives. They were developed by Ciba-Geigy in the 1980s. Fenpiclonil was introduced as a seed treatment in 1988 and was largely superseded by the more photostable and active fludioxonil, which is used for both seed and foliar treatments. They exhibit activity against a range of pathogenic ascomycetes and basidiomycetes. Their primary mode of action involves activation of the fungal high-osmolarity glycerol (HOG) signalling pathway through interaction with a histidine kinase, leading to disruption of fungal growth.

Pyrrolnitrin

Fenpiclonil

Fludioxonil
