= Fludioxonil =

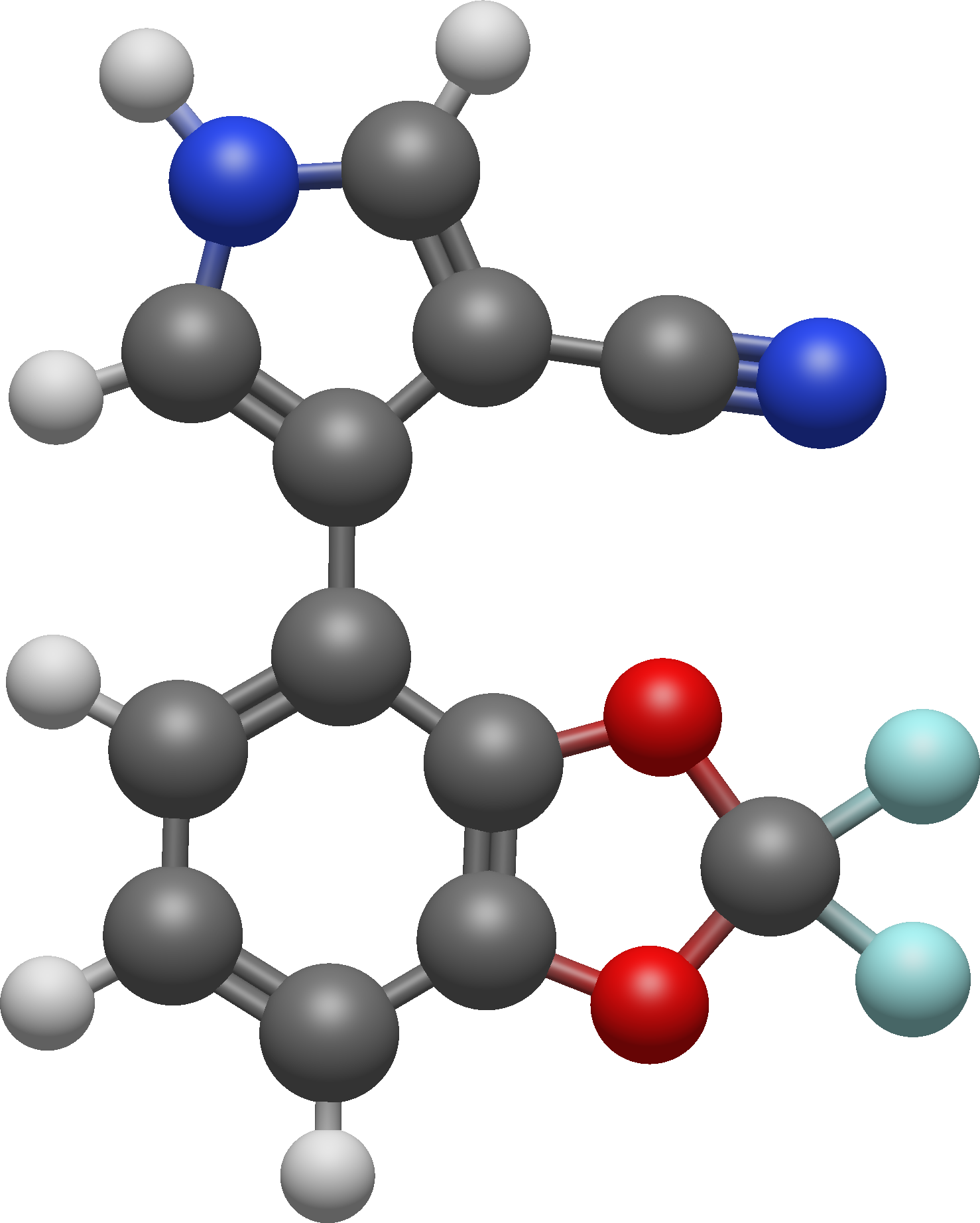

Names
- Preferred IUPAC name 4-(2,2-Difluoro-2H-1,3-benzodioxol-4-yl)-1H-pyrrole-3-carbonitrile

Identifiers
| CAS Number | 131341-86-1 |
| 3D model (JSmol) | Interactive image |
| ChemSpider | 77916 |
| ECHA InfoCard | 100.125.684 |
| KEGG | C18462 |
| PubChem CID | 86398 |
| UNII | ENS9J0YM16 |
| CompTox Dashboard (EPA) | DTXSID2032398 |
- InChI: InChI=1S/C12H6F2N2O2/c13-12(14)17-10-3-1-2-8(11(10)18-12)9-6-16-5-7(9)4-15/h1-3,5-6,16H Key: MUJOIMFVNIBMKC-UHFFFAOYSA-N; InChI=1/C12H6F2N2O2/c13-12(14)17-10-3-1-2-8(11(10)18-12)9-6-16-5-7(9)4-15/h1-3,5-6,16H Key: MUJOIMFVNIBMKC-UHFFFAOYAI
- SMILES: c1cc(c2c(c1)OC(O2)(F)F)c3c[nH]cc3C#N

Properties
| Chemical formula | C_{12}H_{6}F_{2}N_{2}O_{2} |
| Molar mass | 248.189 g·mol^{−1} |
- Except where otherwise noted, data are given for materials in their standard state (at 25 °C [77 °F], 100 kPa). Infobox references

Fludioxonil is a synthetic phenylpyrrole chemical introduced by Ciba-Geigy (now Syngenta) in 1993 for use as a non-systemic fungicide. It is a structural analog of the natural fungicide pyrrolnitrin.

It is used for the treatment of crops, particularly cereals, fruits and vegetables, and ornamental plants. It is often used in combination with another fungicide such as cyprodinil. There was a particularly bad crop failure due to multiresistant B. cinerea in strawberry in Florida in 2012; in that year and many other years, fludioxonil was the only fungicide still providing any protection.

Its mode of action is to inhibit transport-associated phosphorylation of glucose, which reduces mycelial growth rate. Fludioxonil is used against Fusarium, Rhizoctonia, Alternaria, Botrytis cinerea, and Stromatinia cepivora.

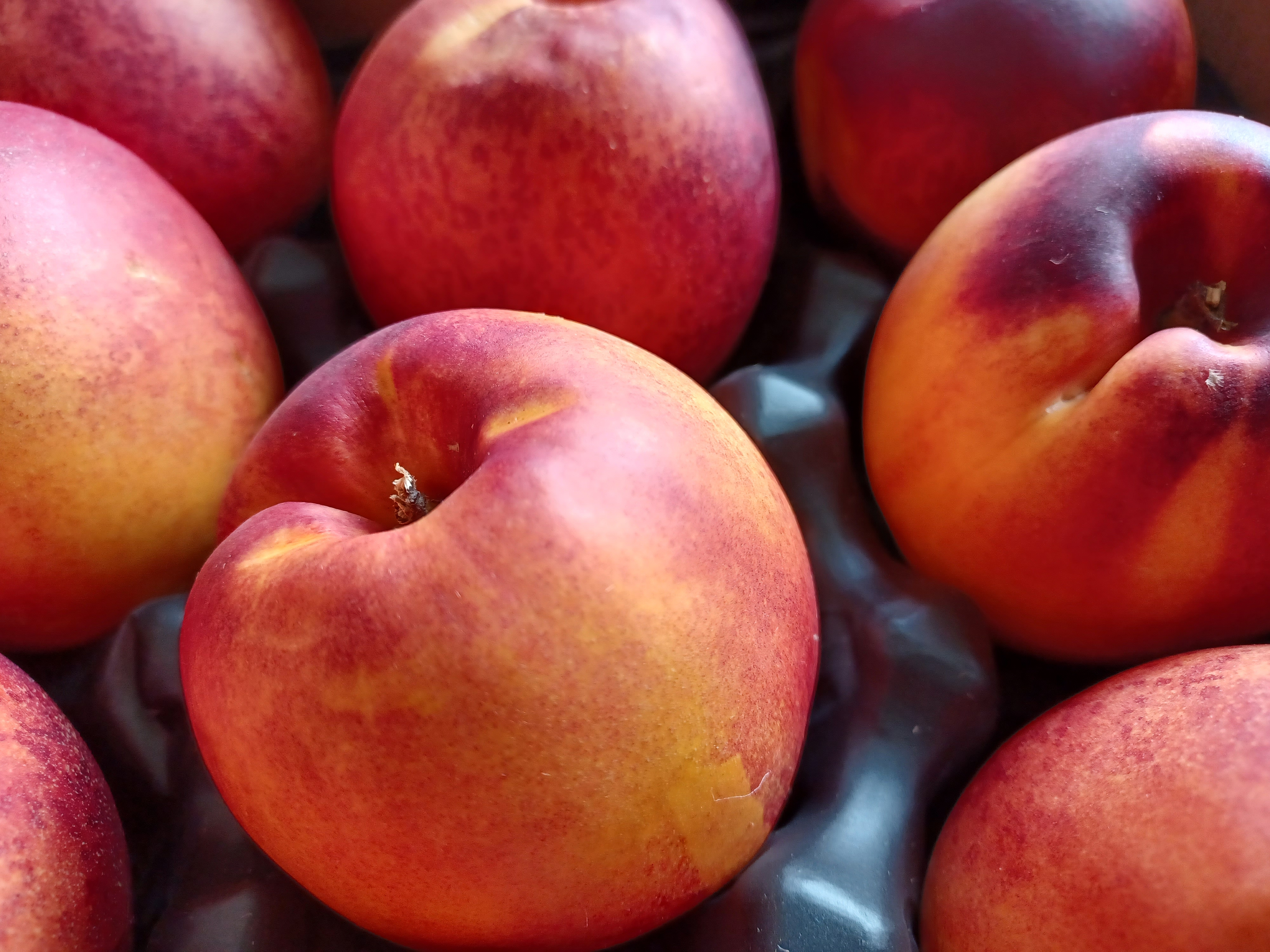
Nectarines treated with fludioxonil

Brand names include seed treatments: Celest, Agri Star Fludioxonil 41 ST, Dyna-shield Fludioxonil, Maxim 4 FS, and Spirato 480 FS, as well as foliar applications: Switch (fludioxonil + cyprodinil).

== Environmental and health hazards ==
It is toxic to fish and other aquatic organisms.

== See also ==
- 1,3-Benzodioxole
