= Iprodione =

Names
- Preferred IUPAC name 3-(3,5-Dichlorophenyl)-2,4-dioxo-N-(propan-2-yl)imidazolidine-1-carboxamide
- Other names Glycophene; Promidione

Identifiers
CAS Number	36734-19-7
3D model (JSmol)	Interactive image
ChEBI	CHEBI:28909
ChemSpider	34418
ECHA InfoCard	100.048.328
EC Number	253-178-9
KEGG	C11208
PubChem CID	37517
UNII	S3AYV2A6EU
CompTox Dashboard (EPA)	DTXSID3024154
- InChI: InChI=1S/C13H13Cl2N3O3/c1-7(2)16-12(20)17-6-11(19)18(13(17)21)10-4-8(14)3-9(15)5-10/h3-5,7H,6H2,1-2H3,(H,16,20) Key: ONUFESLQCSAYKA-UHFFFAOYSA-N; InChI=1/C13H13Cl2N3O3/c1-7(2)16-12(20)17-6-11(19)18(13(17)21)10-4-8(14)3-9(15)5-10/h3-5,7H,6H2,1-2H3,(H,16,20) Key: ONUFESLQCSAYKA-UHFFFAOYAC
- SMILES: O=C2N(c1cc(Cl)cc(Cl)c1)C(=O)CN2C(=O)NC(C)C

Properties
Chemical formula	C_{13}H_{13}Cl_{2}N_{3}O_{3}
Molar mass	330.16662
Appearance	White powder
Melting point	133.4 °C (272.1 °F; 406.5 K)
Boiling point	164.5 °C (328.1 °F; 437.6 K) (decomposes)
Solubility in water	12.2 mg/L at 20 °C
Solubility	in toluene: 147 g/L; in octanol: 10 g/L
Solubility in acetone	342 g/L
Solubility in hexane	0.59 g/L
Solubility in acetonitrile	168 g/L
Solubility in dichloromethane	450 g/L
Solubility in ethyl acetate	225 g/L

Hazards
- Occupational safety and health (OHS/OSH)
Main hazards	Limited evidence of carcinogenic effect
- GHS labelling
Pictograms	(GHS08: Health hazard) (GHS09: Environmental hazard)
Signal word	Warning
Hazard statements	H351, H410
Precautionary statements	P201, P202, P273, P281, P308+P313, P391, P405, P501
- Except where otherwise noted, data are given for materials in their standard state (at 25 °C [77 °F], 100 kPa). verify (what is ?) Infobox references

Iprodione is a hydantoin fungicide and nematicide.

== Application ==
Iprodione is used on crops affected by Botrytis bunch rot, Brown rot, Sclerotinia and other fungal diseases in plants. It is currently applied in a variety of crops: fruit, vegetables, ornamental trees and shrubs and on lawns. It is a contact fungicide that inhibits the germination of fungal spores and it blocks the growth of the fungal mycelium.

It has been marketed under the brand name "Rovral" and "Chipco green" (both brands of Bayer CropScience). This chemical was developed originally by Rhône-Poulenc Agrochimie (later Aventis CropScience and in 2002 acquired by Bayer). As of 2004 there were no composition patents on iprodione.

DevGen NV (Now part of Syngenta) discovered that iprodione kills nematodes and filed for patent protection for those uses.

Iprodione was approved in the Turkish market under the brand name Devguard for use on tomatoes and cucumbers in 2009, and was approved in the US as Enclosure for use in commercial peanut production in May 2010.

Iprodione was approved in Europe in 2010, but approval was not renewed in 2017.
