= Oudemansin A =

Names
- Preferred IUPAC name Methyl (2E,3S,4R,5E)-4-methoxy-2-(methoxymethylidene)-3-methyl-6-phenylhex-5-enoate
- Other names (−)-Oudemansin A

Identifiers
CAS Number	73341-71-6
3D model (JSmol)	Interactive image
ChemSpider	4943167
PubChem CID	6438712
UNII	AF4T7P745Y
- InChI: InChI=1S/C17H22O4/c1-13(15(12-19-2)17(18)21-4)16(20-3)11-10-14-8-6-5-7-9-14/h5-13,16H,1-4H3/b11-10+,15-12+/t13-,16-/m0/s1 Key: COBDENJOXQSLKO-NKAAJRRHSA-N; InChI=1/C17H22O4/c1-13(15(12-19-2)17(18)21-4)16(20-3)11-10-14-8-6-5-7-9-14/h5-13,16H,1-4H3/b11-10+,15-12+/t13-,16-/m0/s1 Key: COBDENJOXQSLKO-NKAAJRRHBD
- SMILES: C[C@H]([C@H](/C=C/C1=CC=CC=C1)OC)/C(=C\OC)/C(=O)OC

Properties
Chemical formula	C_{17}H_{22}O_{4}
Molar mass	290.359 g·mol^{−1}
- Except where otherwise noted, data are given for materials in their standard state (at 25 °C [77 °F], 100 kPa). Infobox references

Oudemansin A is a natural product first isolated from the basidiomycete fungus Oudemansiella mucida. Its chemical structure was determined by X-ray crystallography in 1979 and absolute stereochemistry by total synthesis. Two closely related derivatives, oudemansin B and X have also been isolated from other basidiomycetes. They are all biologically active against many filamentous fungi and yeasts but with insufficient potency and stability to become useful commercial products. However, their discovery, together with the strobilurins led to agricultural fungicides including azoxystrobin with the same mechanism of action.

== Isolation and characterization ==
Oudemansins A, B, and X

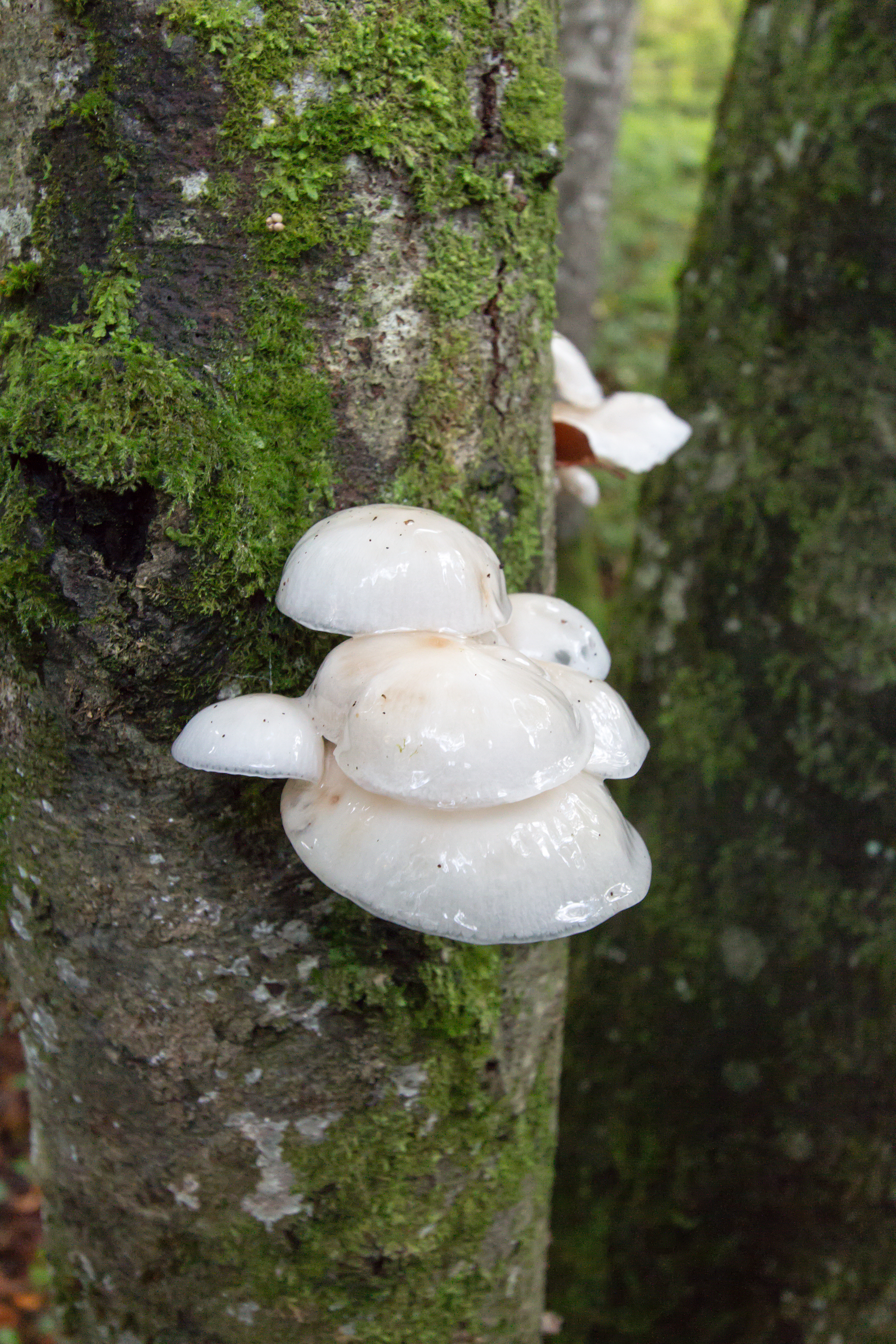
O. mucida on a beech trunk

Oudemansin A (initially known simply as oudemansin) with R_{1} = R_{2} = H was first described in 1979, after being isolated from mycelial fermentations of the basidiomycete fungus Oudemansiella mucida. Its structure, including the relative configuration of the methoxy and adjacent methyl groups, was established by both spectroscopic methods and single crystal X-ray analysis but its absolute stereochemistry was at that time undetermined. Later it was found in cultures of the basidiomycete fungi Mycena polygramma and Xerula melanotricha. The latter fungus also produces oudemansin B, with R_{1} = MeO and R_{2} = Cl. Oudemansin X, with R_{1} = H and R_{2} = MeO was isolated from Oudemansiella radicata.

== Chemical synthesis ==
The oudemansins have been targets for total synthesis and in 1983, the synthesis of (-)-oudemansin A established that all three compounds have the (9S,10S)-configuration. Routes to oudemansins B and X have also been reported.

== Mechanism of action as fungicides ==
The fungicidal effects were shown to stem from what was then a novel mode of action, QoI inhibition. This was related to the β-methoxyacrylic acid sub-structure which this and related natural products, the strobilurins have in common. Intensive research by several agrochemical companies led to the development of useful agricultural fungicides based on the same mode of action, of which azoxystrobin is a typical example.
