= Pesticide research =

Scientific researches on pesticides

Early twenty-first century pesticide research has focused on developing molecules that combine low use rates and that are more selective, safer, resistance-breaking and cost-effective. Obstacles include increasing pesticide resistance and an increasingly stringent regulatory environment.

The sources of new molecules employ natural products, competitors, universities, chemical vendors, combinatorial chemistry libraries, intermediates from projects in other indications and compound collections from pharmaceutical and animal health companies.

== History ==
Along with improved agrochemicals, seeds, fertilizers, mechanization, and precision farming, improved protection of crops from weeds, insects and other threats is highly sought. Developments over the past 1960–2013 period enabled reduced use rates, in the cases of the sulfonylurea herbicides (5), the piperidinylthiazole fungicides, and the emamectin insecticides and acaricides, reaching 99%, with concomitant environmental improvements.

The rate of new molecule introductions has declined. The costs to bring a new molecule to market have risen from U.S. $152 million in 1995 to $256 million in 2005, as the number of compounds synthesized to deliver one new market introduction rose from 52,500 in 1995 to 140,000 in 2005.

New active ingredient registrations with the US Environmental Protection Agency (EPA) over the 1997–2010 period included biological (B), natural product (NP), synthetic (S) and synthetic natural derived (SND) substances. Combining conventional pesticides and biopesticides, NPs accounted for the majority of registrations, with 35.7%, followed by S with 30.7%, B with 27.4% and SND with 6.1%.

== Research process ==
Candidate molecules are optimized through a design-synthesis-test-analysis cycle. While compounds eventually are tested on the target organism(s). However, in vitro assays are becoming more common.

== Parallels with pharmaceuticals ==
Agrochemicals and pharmaceuticals may operate via the same processes. In several cases, a homologous enzyme/receptor is addressed, and can potentially be of use in both contexts. One example is the triazole antimycotics or fungicides. However, the chemical environments encountered en route from the application site to the target generally require differing physicochemical properties, while the unit costs are generally much lower. Agrochemicals typically have a lower number of hydrogen bond donors. For example, over 70% of insecticides have no hydrogen bond donor, and over 90% of herbicides have two or fewer. Desirable agrochemicals have residual activity and persistence of effect lasting up to several weeks to allow large spray intervals. The majority of heterocycles found in agrochemicals are heteroaromatic.

== Structure-based design ==
Structure-based design is a multidisciplinary process that is relatively new in agrochemicals. As of 2013 no products on the market were the direct result of this approach. However, discovery programs have benefited from structure-based design, including that for scytalone dehydratase inhibitors as rice blast fungicides.

Structure-based design is appealing for crop researchers because of the many protein structures in the public domain, which increased from 13,600 to 92,700 between 200 and 2013. Many agrochemical crystals are now in the public domain. The structures of several interesting ion channels are now in the public domain. For example, the crystal structure of a glutamate-gated chloride channel in complex with ivermectin was reported in 2011 and represents a starting point for the design of novel insecticides. This structure led to a homology model for a related γ-aminobutyric acid (GABA)–gated chloride channel and a binding mode for the meta-diamides, another insecticide class.

== Fragment- and target-based design ==
Techniques such as fragment-based design, virtual screening and genome sequencing have helped generate drug leads. Published examples of fragment-based agrochemical design have been comparatively rare, although the method was used to generate new ACC inhibitors. A combination of in silico fragment-based design with protein ligand crystal structures yielded synthetically amenable compounds. Common to all inhibitors is the methoxyacrylate "warhead", whose interactions and position are well known from the strobilurin fungicides. Fragments were linked to the warhead to form a virtual library.

The likelihood of finding active analogs on the basis of a screen hit from a novel scaffold can be increased by virtual screening. Because the pharmacophore of the reference ligand is well defined, a virtual library of potential herbicidal inhibitors of the enzyme anthranilate synthase was generated by keeping the core scaffold constant and attaching different linkers. The scores obtained from docking studies ranked these molecules. Resulting novel compounds showed a primary hit rate of 10.9%, much higher than for conventional high-throughput screening. Other tools like three-dimensional (3D) shape, atom-type similarity, or 2D extended connectivity fingerprints also retrieve molecules of interest out of a database with a useful success rate. Scaffold-hopping is also efficiently achieved by virtual screening, with 2D and 3D variants providing the best results.

Genome-sequencing, gene knockout or antisense knockdown techniques have provided agrochemists with a method for validating potential new biochemical targets. However, genes such as avirulence genes are not essential for the organism and many potential targets lack known inhibitors. Examples of this procedure include the search for new herbicidal compounds of the nonmevalonate, such as the discovery of new inhibitors of 2-C-methyl-D-erythritol 4-phosphate cytidylyltransferase (IspD, Enzyme Commission (EC) number 2.7.7.60) with the best expressing a half-maximal inhibitory concentration (IC50) of 140 nM in the greenhouse at 3 kg/ha (2.7 lb/acre). Thanks to an x-ray crystal structure of Arabidopsis thaliana, IspD enzyme cocrystallized with the inhibitor, a more potent inhibitor with an IC50 of 35 nM was designed. Mitochondrial serine hydroxymethyltransferase (SHMT) inhibitors were also found. Three hundred thousand compounds were tested against the SHMT enzyme, producing 24 hits. Among those hits, a subclass was followed with in vivo screening and compounds were promoted to field trials.

== Plant activation ==
Plant activators are compounds that activate a plant's immune system in response to invasion by pathogens. They play a crucial role in crop survival. Unlike pesticides, plant activators are not pathogen specific and are not affected by drug resistance, making them ideal for use in agriculture. Wet-rice farmers across East Asia use plant activators as a sustainable means to enhance crop health.

The activation of plant responses is often associated with arrested growth and reductions in yield, for reasons that remain unclear. The molecular mechanisms governing plant activators are largely unknown.

Screening can distinguish compounds that independently induce immune responses from those that do so exclusively in the presence of some pathogen. Independent activators can be toxic to cells. Others enhance resistance only in the presence of pathogens. In 2012, five activators that protected against Pseudomonas bacteria by priming immune response without directly activating defense genes. The compounds inhibit two enzymes that inactivate the defense hormone salicylic acid (SA glucosyltransferases or SAGTs), providing enhanced disease resistance.
