= FMX =

FMX may stand for:

- FMX (broadcasting), a system employing audio noise reduction
- FMX (Conference), an annual conference on visual effects in Stuttgart, taking place in February
- Famoxadone, a pesticide abbreviated as FMX
- FireMonkey, a visual software development framework abbreviated as FMX used for building user interfaces in Delphi, C++Builder and Python
- Ford FMX Transmission, an automatic transmission
- Freestyle Motocross, a variation on the sport of motocross in which motorcycle riders attempt to impress judges with jumps and stunts
- Full Mouth X-ray
- Fomento Económico Mexicano, a Mexican beverage and retail company
