= Methoxyacrylates =

Class of chemical compounds

Central structural element of methoxyacrylates

Methoxyacrylates (more precisely β-methoxyacrylates) are a group of organic compounds primarily used as fungicides. They comprise an acrylic acid ester unit that also includes a methoxy group, making them a type of enol ether.

== Structure and effect ==
The methoxyacrylate group is derived from strobilurins. Strobilurins feature a diene unit, which renders them only slightly photostable. In their synthetic analogs, this diene unit is typically replaced by other structural elements, usually aromatic rings. Methoxyacrylates inhibit cytochrome c oxidase, thereby blocking electron transport and the respiratory chain in the mitochondrion of fungi. Specifically, the active ingredients bind to the binding site for the oxidation of ubiquinol. The interruption of the respiratory chain prevents the biosynthesis of adenosine triphosphate, leads to energy deficiency and thus to the death of the fungi. The methoxyacrylate unit is critical to this inhibitory effect, which is why the active substance group is named after it.

== Representatives and use ==
Structure of azoxystrobin

Notable representatives of methoxyacrylates include azoxystrobin and picoxystrobin. Broadly speaking, the term also encompasses compounds lacking a methoxyacrylate unit, such as kresoxim-methyl, which features an oxime ether unit instead. This unit is isosteric with the enol ether unit, allowing the compound to exert a similar effect. Azoxystrobin was the first compound of this group to be approved in 1996, and more than ten compounds are now in commercial use. Additional representatives include pyraclostrobin, trifloxystrobin, fluoxastrobin, enoxastrobin, metominostrobin, coumoxystrobin, dimoxystrobin, fluacrypyrim, and orysastrobin.

Methoxyacrylates are utilized as agricultural fungicides. Their primary advantage is their potent toxicity against a wide range of fungi, coupled with low toxicity in mammals, making them a vital class of active ingredients. Methoxyacrylates hold significant importance in the field of agricultural fungicides, with a substantial market share. In 1999, this group of active ingredients accounted for over 10% of the fungicide market, with sales totaling US$620 million, led by azoxystrobin, which alone generated approximately US$415 million in sales. In 2016, methoxyacrylates continued to dominate the fungicide market, with the top three fungicides by sales value—azoxystrobin, pyraclostrobin, and trifloxystrobin—all belonging to this group.
