= Azoxystrobin =

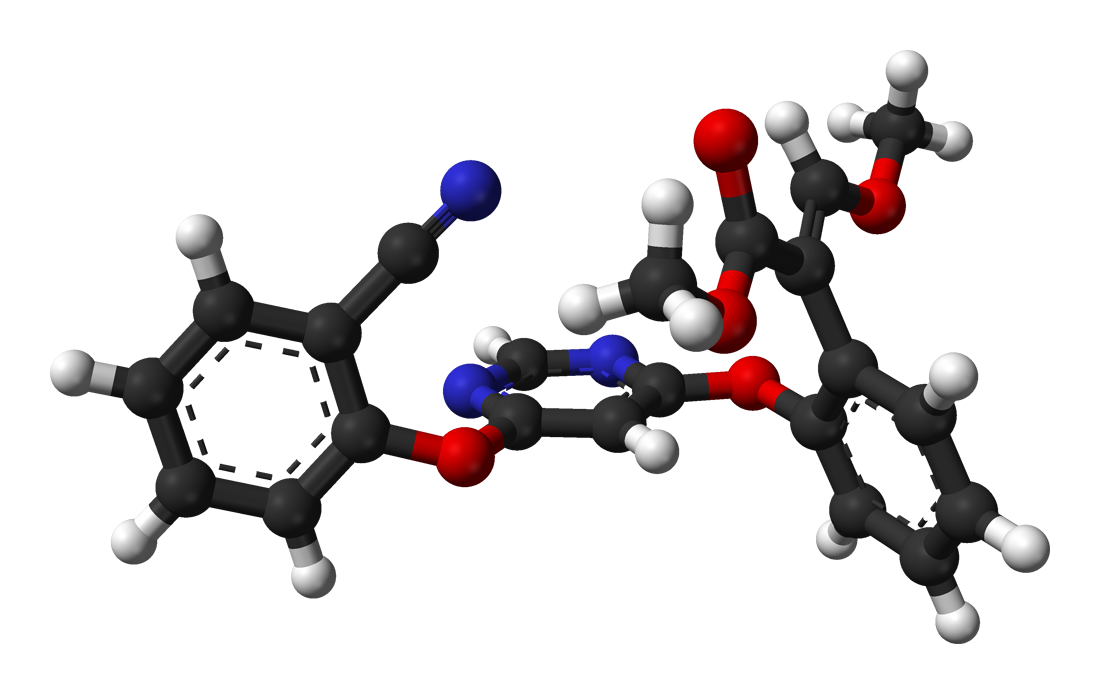

Names
- Preferred IUPAC name Methyl (2E)-2-(2-{[6-(2-cyanophenoxy)pyrimidin-4-yl]oxy}phenyl)-3-methoxyprop-2-enoate
- Other names Azoxystrobine, ICIA5504

Identifiers
CAS Number	131860-33-8
3D model (JSmol)	Interactive image
Beilstein Reference	8350244
ChEBI	CHEBI:40909
ChEMBL	ChEMBL230001
ChemSpider	2298772
DrugBank	DB07401
ECHA InfoCard	100.127.964
EC Number	603-524-3
KEGG	C18558
PubChem CID	3034285
UNII	NYH7Y08IPM
CompTox Dashboard (EPA)	DTXSID0032520
- InChI: InChI=1S/C22H17N3O5/c1-27-13-17(22(26)28-2)16-8-4-6-10-19(16)30-21-11-20(24-14-25-21)29-18-9-5-3-7-15(18)12-23/h3-11,13-14H,1-2H3/b17-13+ Key: WFDXOXNFNRHQEC-GHRIWEEISA-N; InChI=1/C22H17N3O5/c1-27-13-17(22(26)28-2)16-8-4-6-10-19(16)30-21-11-20(24-14-25-21)29-18-9-5-3-7-15(18)12-23/h3-11,13-14H,1-2H3/b17-13+ Key: WFDXOXNFNRHQEC-GHRIWEEIBD
- SMILES: O=C(OC)\C(=C\OC)c3ccccc3Oc2ncnc(Oc1c(C#N)cccc1)c2

Properties
Chemical formula	C_{22}H_{17}N_{3}O_{5}
Molar mass	403.388
Appearance	White crystalline solid
Density	1.34 g/cm^{3}
Melting point	116°C
Solubility in water	6.7 mg/L (20 °C)
log P	2.5

Hazards
- GHS labelling
Pictograms	(GHS07: Exclamation mark) (GHS09: Environmental hazard)
Signal word	Danger
Hazard statements	H331, H410
Precautionary statements	P261, P271, P273, P304+P340, P311, P321, P391, P403+P233, P405, P501
- Except where otherwise noted, data are given for materials in their standard state (at 25 °C [77 °F], 100 kPa). Infobox references

Azoxystrobin is a broad spectrum systemic fungicide widely used in agriculture to protect crops from fungal diseases. It was first marketed in 1996 using the brand name Amistar and by 1999 it had been registered in 48 countries on more than 50 crops. In the year 2000 it was announced that it had been granted UK Millennium product status.

== History ==
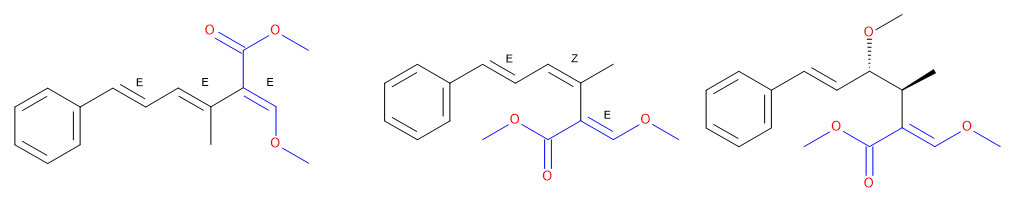
EEE (incorrect first published structure) and EZE strobilurin A with the related natural product fungicide oudemansin A

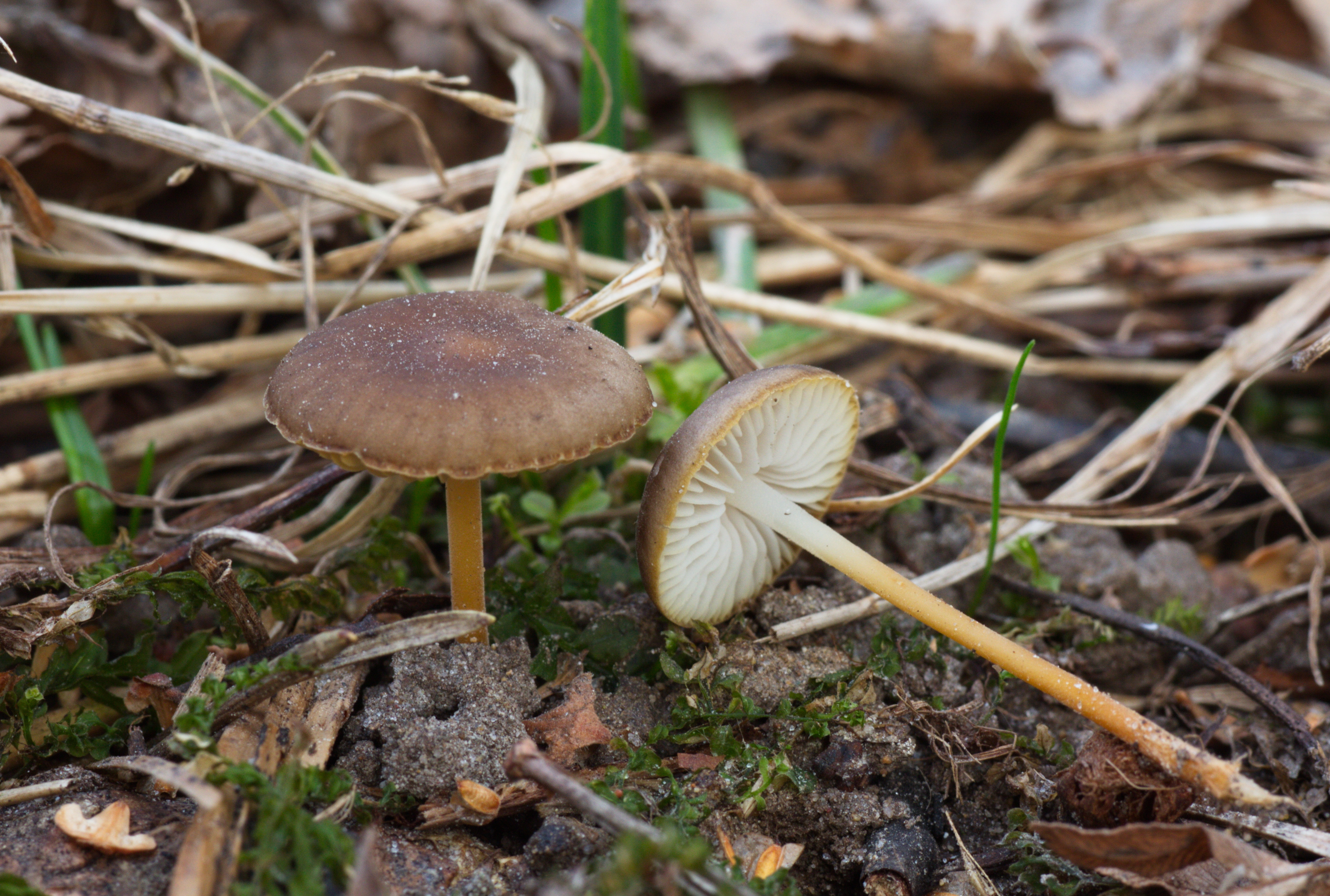
Strobilurus tenacellus

In 1977, academic research groups in Germany published details of two new antifungal antibiotics they had isolated from the basidiomycete fungus Strobilurus tenacellus. They named these strobilurin A and B but did not provide detailed structures, only data based on their high-resolution mass spectra, which showed that the simpler of the two had molecular formula C_{16}H_{18}O_{3}. In the following year, further details including structures were published and a related fungicide, oudemansin A from the fungus Oudemansiella mucida, whose identity had been determined by X-ray crystallography, was disclosed. When the fungicidal effects were shown to stem from what was then a novel mode of action, chemists at the Imperial Chemical Industries (ICI) research site at Jealott's Hill became interested to use them as leads to develop new fungicides suitable for use in agriculture. The first task was to synthesize a sample of strobilurin A for testing. In doing so, it was discovered that the structure that had been published was incorrect in the stereochemistry of one of the double bonds: the strobilurins, in fact, have the E,Z,E not E,E,E configuration. Once this was realised and the correct material was made and tested it was shown, as expected, to be active in vitro but insufficiently stable to light to be active in the glasshouse. A large programme of chemistry to make analogues was begun when it was discovered that a new stilbene structure containing the β-methoxyacrylate portion (shown in blue and believed to be the toxophore) had good activity in glasshouse tests but still lacked sufficient photostability. After more than 1400 analogues had been made and tested the team chose azoxystrobin for commercialisation and it was developed under the code number ICIA5504.

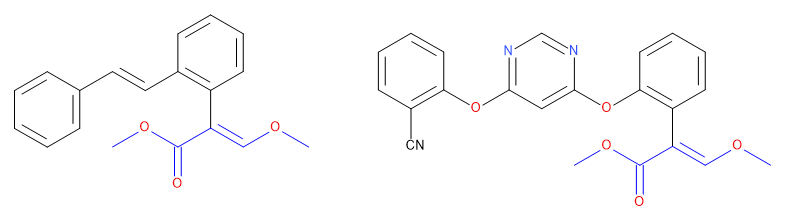
The stilbene was the first synthetic analogue to show activity and led to azoxystrobin

First sales were in 1996 using the brand name Amistar: it then gained fast-track registration in the United States, where it was marketed in 1997 as Heritage. By 1999 it had been registered in 48 countries on more than 50 crops. In the year 2000 it was announced that it had been granted Millennium product status by the UK Prime Minister, Tony Blair, as it had become in three years the world's best-selling fungicide. Meanwhile, BASF scientists who were collaborating with the German academic groups that had discovered strobilurin A had independently invented kresoxim-methyl, which was also launched in 1996.

== Synthesis ==
The first synthesis of azoxystrobin was disclosed in patents filed by the ICI group. The sequence of the two substitution reactions allows for the synthesis of a diverse range of structural analogs via an Ullmann-type etherification between the aryl chloride of the first intermediate and a substituted phenol, thus introducing a range of structural diversity while maintaining the central strobin toxophore. The final choice of 2-cyano phenol in the second step of the synthesis was made after many other alternatives had been tested for their fungicidal properties.

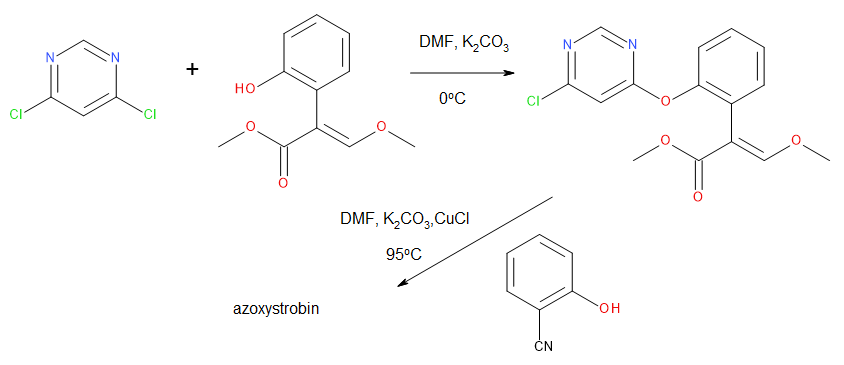

The crystal structure was published in 2008.

== Mechanism of action ==
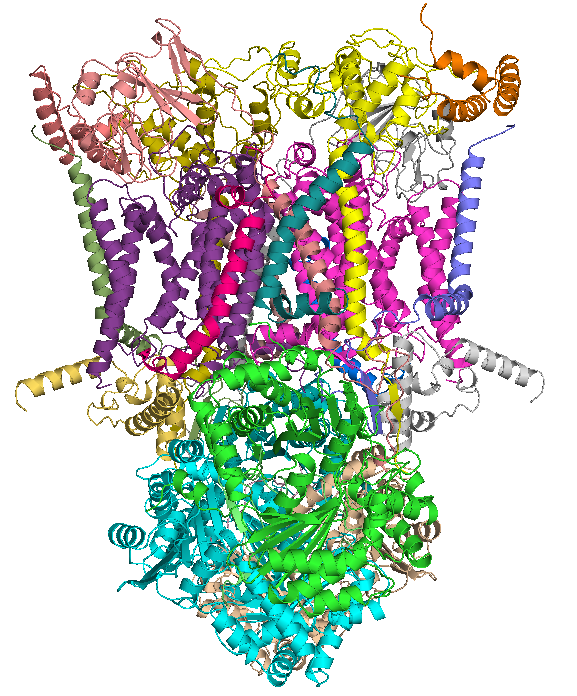
Cytochrome bc1 with bound ubiquinone

Azoxystrobin and other strobilurins inhibit mitochondrial respiration by blocking electron transport. They bind at the quinol outer binding site of the cytochrome b-c1 complex, where ubiquinone (coenzyme Q10) would normally bind when carrying electrons to that protein. Thus production of ATP is prevented. The generic name for this mode of action is "Quinone Outside Inhibitors" QoI.

== Formulations ==
Azoxystrobin is made available to end-users only in formulated products. Since the active ingredient has moderate solubility in water, formulations aid its use in water-based sprays by creating an emulsion when diluted. Modern products use non-powdery formulations with reduced or no use of hazardous solvents, for example suspension concentrates. The fungicide is compatible with many other pesticides and adjuvants when mixed by the farmer for spraying.

== Usage ==
Azoxystrobin is a xylem-mobile systemic fungicide with translaminar, protectant and curative properties. In cereal crops, its main outlet, the length of disease control is generally about four to six weeks during the period of active stem elongation. All pesticides are required to seek registration from appropriate authorities in the country in which they will be used. In the United States, the Environmental Protection Agency (EPA) is responsible for regulating pesticides under the Federal Insecticide, Fungicide, and Rodenticide Act (FIFRA) and the Food Quality Protection Act (FQPA). A pesticide can only be used legally according to the directions on the label that is included at the time of the sale of the pesticide. The purpose of the label is "to provide clear directions for effective product performance while minimizing risks to human health and the environment". A label is a legally binding document that mandates how the pesticide can and must be used and failure to follow the label as written when using the pesticide is a federal offence. Within the European Union, a 2-tiered approach is used for the approval and authorisation of pesticides. Firstly, before a formulated product can be developed for market, the active substance must be approved for the European Union. After this has been achieved, authorisation for the specific product must be sought from every Member State that the applicant wants to sell it to. Afterwards, there is a monitoring programme to make sure the pesticide residues in food are below the limits set by the European Food Safety Authority.

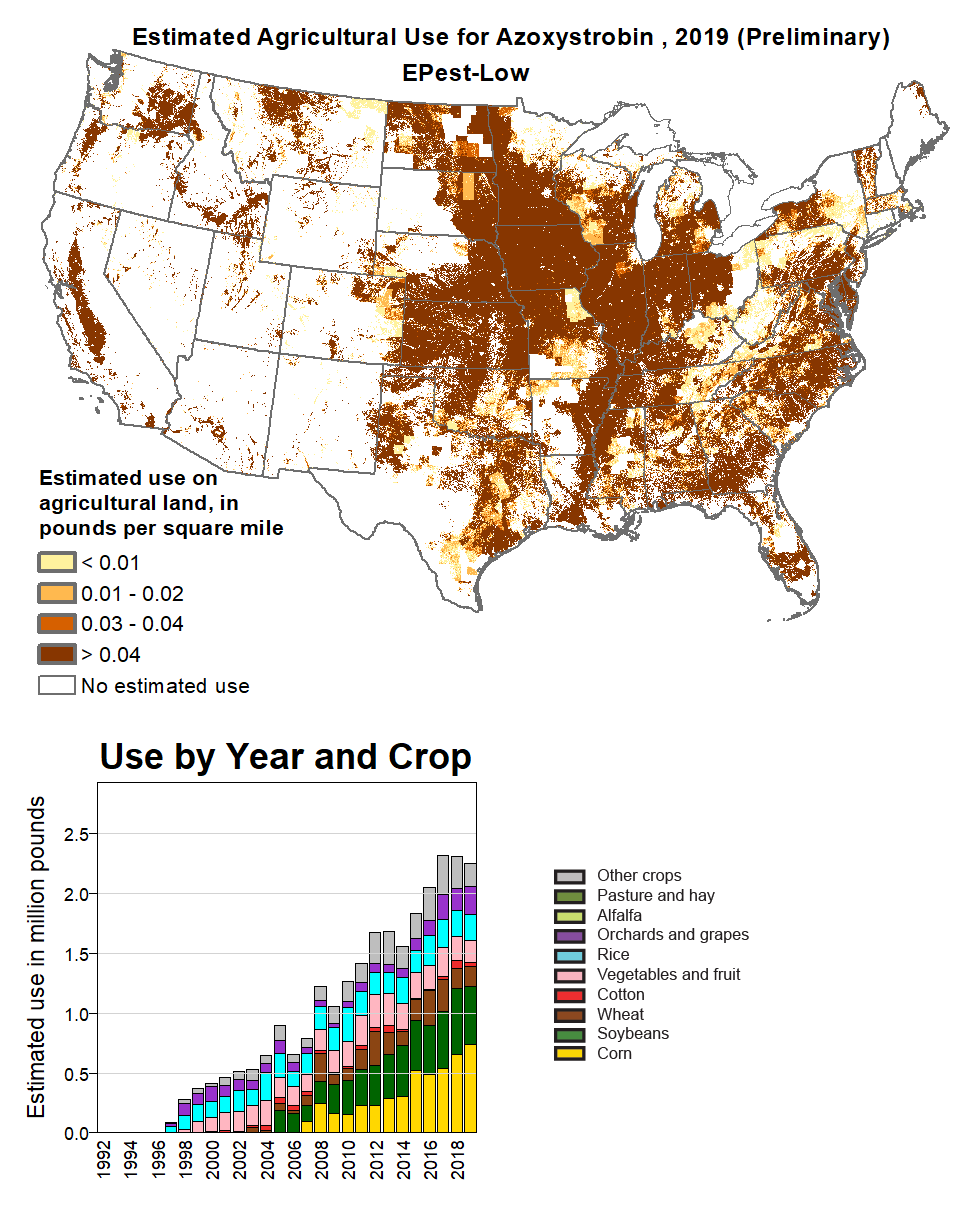
Azoxystrobin usage in the US to 2019 (estimated)

=== Agriculture and Horticulture ===
Azoxystrobin possesses a broad spectrum of activity, in common with other QoI's. Examples of the fungal groups on which it is effective are Ascomycota, Deuteromycota, and Basidiomycota, as well as the oomycetes. In addition, its properties mean that it can move systemically through plant tissue to protect parts of the crop that were not in contact with the spray. This combination of properties has meant that it achieved widespread use very quickly and has reached annual sales of more than $500 million. Important diseases which it controls include leaf spot, rusts, powdery mildew, downy mildew, net blotch and blight. Worldwide, azoxystrobin is registered for use on all important crops. For example, in the European Union and United States, it is registered for use in wheat, barley, oats, rye, soya, cotton, rice, strawberry, peas, beans, onions and many other vegetables. The advantage to the farmer comes in the form of improved yield at harvest. Farmers can act in their best economic interest: the value of the additional yield can be estimated and the total cost of using the fungicide informs the decision to purchase. This cost-benefit analysis by the end user sets a maximum price which the supplier can demand and in practice pesticide prices fluctuate according to the current market value of the crops in which they are used. The estimated annual use of azoxystrobin in US agriculture is mapped by the US Geological Survey and shows an increasing trend from its introduction in 1997 to 2019, the latest date for which figures are available, and now reaching 2,300,000 pounds (1,000,000 kg).

=== Home and garden ===
One of the earliest uses of azoxystrobin was to control fungal diseases of turf and it has been used on golf courses and lawns. It is now available for domestic markets under brand names such as Heritage and Azoxy 2SC.

Azoxystrobin is added to mold-resistant Purple wallboards (optiSHIELD AT, mixture of azoxystrobin and thiabendazole) and can leach into house dust, potentially providing a source of life-long exposure to children and adults.

== Human safety ==
Azoxystrobin has little toxicity to mammals with an LD_{50} of over 5000 mg/kg (rats, oral). However, it can cause skin and eye irritation. First aid information is included with the label. The World Health Organization (WHO) and Food and Agriculture Organization (FAO) joint meeting on pesticide residues has determined that the acceptable daily intake for azoxystrobin is 0-0.2 mg/kg bodyweight per day. The Codex Alimentarius database maintained by the FAO lists the maximum residue limits for azoxystrobin in various food products.

== Effects on the environment ==
Azoxystrobin is categorized as having a low potential for bioconcentration and of moderate risk to fish, earthworms and bees but of high risk to aquatic crustaceans, so care must be taken to avoid runoff into water bodies. Its main degradation product, the carboxylic acid resulting from hydrolysis of its methyl ester, is also potentially harmful to aquatic environments. The benefits and risks of use of QoI fungicides have been reviewed and there is extensive literature on azoxystrobin's environmental profile. Ultimately it is the regulatory authorities in each country who must weigh up the benefits to end users and balance these against the compound's inherent hazards and consequent risks to consumers and the wider environment.

== Resistance Management ==
Fungal populations have the ability to develop resistance to QoI inhibitors. This potential can be mitigated by careful management. Reports of individual pest species becoming resistant to azoxystrobin are monitored by manufacturers, regulatory bodies such as the EPA and the Fungicides Resistance Action Committee (FRAC), who assign fungicides into classes by mode of action. In some cases, the risks of resistance developing can be reduced by using a mixture of two or more fungicides which each have activity on relevant pests but with unrelated mechanisms of action. FRAC assigns fungicides into classes so as to facilitate this. On cereal crops in the US, for example, azoxystrobin may only be used in mixture, usually with an azole fungicide such as difenoconazole.

== Brands ==
Azoxystrobin is the ISO common name for the active ingredient which is formulated into the branded product sold to end-users. By international convention and in many countries the law, pesticide labels are required to include the common name of the active ingredients. These names are not the exclusive property of the holder of any patent or trademark and as such they are the easiest way for non-experts to refer to individual chemicals. Companies selling pesticides normally do so using a brand name or wordmark which allows them to distinguish their product from competitor products having the same active ingredient. In many cases, this branding is country and formulation-specific so after several years of sales there can be multiple brand names for a given active ingredient. The situation is made even more complicated when companies license their ingredients to others, as is often done. In addition, the product may be pre-mixed with other pesticides under a new brand name.

It is therefore difficult to provide a comprehensive list of brand names for products containing azoxystrobin. They include Amistar, Abound, Heritage, Olympus, Ortiva, Priori Xtra, Scotts DiseaseEx, Haedes and Quadris. Suppliers and brand names in the United States are listed in the National Pesticide Information Retrieval System.
