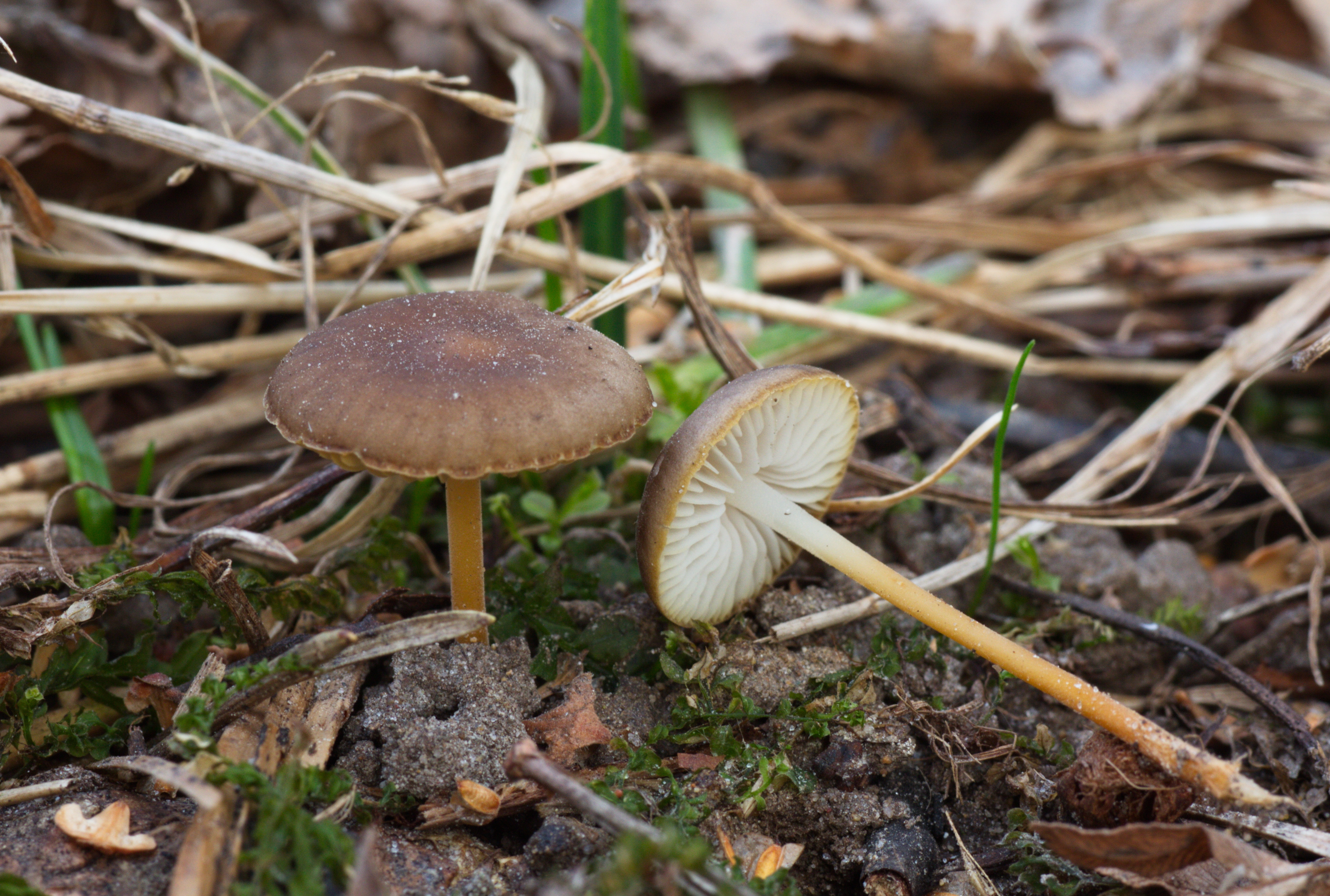

Scientific classification
- Kingdom: Fungi
- Division: Basidiomycota
- Class: Agaricomycetes
- Order: Agaricales
- Family: Physalacriaceae
- Genus: Strobilurus
- Species: S. tenacellus

Binomial name
- Strobilurus tenacellus (Pers.) Singer (1962)

Synonyms
- Agaricus tenacellus Pers. (1796); Collybia tenacella (Pers.) P.Kumm. (1871); Collybia esculenta var. tenacella (Pers.) P.Karst. (1879); Marasmius esculentus var. tenacellus (Pers.) P.Karst. (1889); Marasmius tenacellus (Pers.) J.Favre (1939); Pseudohiatula tenacella (Pers.) Métrod (1952); Pseudohiatula esculenta subsp. tenacella (Pers.) Hongo (1959)

= Strobilurus tenacellus =

Species of fungus

Strobilurus tenacellus, commonly known as the pinecone cap, is a species of agaric fungus in the family Physalacriaceae. It is found throughout Asia and Europe, where it grows on the fallen cones of pine and spruce trees. The fruit bodies (mushrooms) are small, with convex to flat, reddish to brownish caps up to 15 mm (0.6 in) in diameter, set atop thin cylindrical stems up to 4–7.5 cm (1.6–3.0 in) long with a rooting base. A characteristic microscopic feature of the mushroom is the sharp, thin-walled cystidia found on the stipe, gills, and cap. The mushrooms, sometimes described as edible, are too small to be of culinary interest. The fungus releases compounds called strobilurins that suppress the growth and development of other fungi. Derivatives of these compounds are used as an important class of agricultural fungicides.

== Taxonomy ==
The species was first described as Agaricus tenacellus by Christian Hendrik Persoon in his 1796 Observationes Mycologicae. In its taxonomic history, it was moved to the genera Collybia by Paul Kummer in 1803, Marasmius by Jules Favre in 1939, and Pseudohiatula by Georges Métrod in 1952. Rolf Singer transferred it to the newly circumscribed genus Strobilurus in 1962, giving it the name by which it is currently known.

The specific epithet tenacellus is a diminutive form of the Latin word tenax, meaning "tough". Its British Mycological Society-recommended common name is the "pinecone cap". English botanist James Edward Smith called it the "dark fir-cone Agaric" in his 1836 work The English Flora.

== Description ==
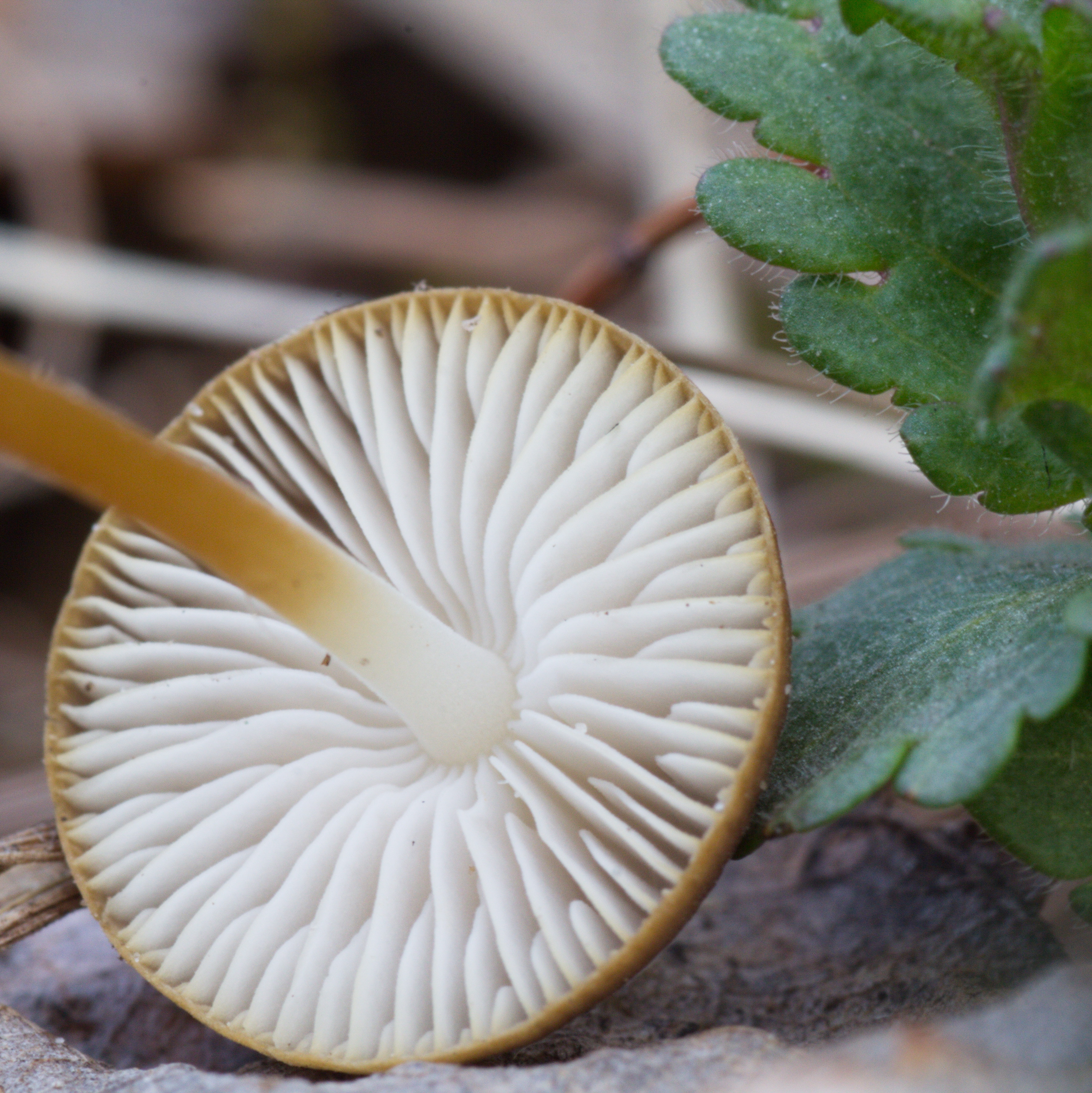
The gills are notched and interspersed with several tiers of lamellulae.

The cap is initially convex before flattening out, sometimes retaining a small central papilla, and sometimes developing a central depression; the cap diameter reaches 5–15 mm (0.2–0.6 in). The smooth cap is hygrophanous (i.e., it changes colour as it loses or absorbs moisture), and has shallow radial grooves extending about halfway up the cap. Its colour is reddish to brownish, and is often paler in the center than the margin; when dry, the colour fades to greyish. The greyish-white gills have a free to deeply emarginate (notched) attachment to the cap. They are somewhat crowded together, numbering 20–25 gills with 1 to 7 tiers of interspersed lamellulae (short gills that do not extend fully from the cap margin to the stipe). The cylindrical stipe measures 4–7.5 cm (1.6–3.0 in) long by 0.5–2 mm thick, and has at its base a root-like pseudorrhiza that extends into the substrate. The upper stipe is yellowish brown, while lower it is dark orange-brown to reddish brown. The flesh has no odour and usually has a bitter taste. While the fruit bodies are sometimes described as are edible, they are too small to be of culinary interest.

The spore print is white. Spores are roughly elliptical to tear-shaped, with dimensions of 5.0–7.5 by 2.4–4.0 μm. The basidia (spore-bearing cells) are four-spored, and measure 20–40 by 7–11 μm. Cheilocystidia (cystidia on the gill edge) are thin walled, plentiful, spindle-shaped to somewhat flask-shaped with a sharp tip, and measure 30–70 by 3–10 μm. The pleurocystidia (on the gill face) are similar in shape and size to the cheilocystidia, although usually not quite as numerous. The cap cuticle is made of a hymeniderm of club-shaped to somewhat spherical cells measuring 8–25 by 7–20 μm, mixed with flask-shaped pileocystidia (cystidia on the cap) that are 20–45 by 5–11 μm. Hyphae lack clamp connections.

=== Similar species ===
Strobilurus esculentus and S. stephanocystis are similar in appearance to S. tenacellus. S. esculentus mushrooms have thin, sharp cap margins and only fruit on fallen spruce cones. S. stephanocystis has a yellow-brown to reddish-yellow cap that is not hygrophanous. Baeospora myosura is another small agaric that grows on pine and spruce cones, but it fruits in autumn.

== Habitat and distribution ==
Strobilurus tenacellus is a saprobic wood-rotting fungus. It fruits singly or in small groups on fallen and often partially buried cones of Scots pine (Pinus sylvestris), European black pine (Pinus nigra) and sometimes spruce (Picea) in coniferous and mixed forests. It is found in Europe and Asia, where it has been recorded in Japan and Jordan. In Europe, the fungus usually fruits from March to June. Its occurrence is occasional.

== Bioactive compounds ==
Azoxystrobin is a commercial fungicide developed from this mushroom

Two cyathane-like diterpenoids, (12S)-11α,14α-epoxy-13α,14β,15-trihydroxycyath-3-ene and (12R)-11α,14α-epoxy-13α,14β,15-trihydroxycyath-3-ene, have been isolated and identified from the liquid culture of the fungus. These compounds inhibit the growth of certain tumor cells when grown in vitro.

Using a standard laboratory method to determine antimicrobial susceptibility, methanol-based extracts of Strobilurus tenacellus fruit bodies were shown in a 2000 study to have low antibacterial activity against the bacterium Bacillus subtilis, and low to moderate activity against the fungi Candida albicans and Aspergillus fumigatus. The fungus produces the natural antibiotic strobilurin A, which was reported as a novel compound from this species in 1977; other strobilurins have since been found in other basidiomycete wood-rotting fungi, like Porcelain Mushroom for example. Strobilurin A is thought to be derived biosynthetically from the amino acid L-phenylalanine. In nature, the fungus secretes the chemical to prevent invasion by other fungi that challenge its nutrient source. It works by blocking electron transfer in the mitochondria, stopping respiration by binding to the ubihydroquinone oxidation center of the bc_{1} complex. This prevents the competing fungus from creating its own energy and inhibiting its growth at the earliest stages of the life cycle, the spore germination stage. The fungus is resistant to its own chemical because its ubihydroquinone has three amino acid residues that prevent the strobilurins from binding. Because of their sensitivity to light, and high vapor pressures that causes them to rapidly disappear when applied to the surface of a leaf, chemically unmodified strobilurins are not generally useful as fungicides for agricultural use. The strobilurin-derived compound azoxystrobin, first made commercially available in 1996, was designed to overcome these limitations. It is the world's biggest-selling fungicide. Other commercial fungicides developed from the strobilurins include kresoxim-methyl, picoxystrobin, fluoxastrobin, pyraclostrobin and trifloxystrobin.
