= Famoxadone =

Names
- IUPAC name (RS)-5-Methyl-5-(4-phenoxyphenyl)-3-(phenylamino)-1,3-oxazolidine-2,4-dione
- Other names Famoxate; FMX

Identifiers
CAS Number	131807-57-3
3D model (JSmol)	Interactive image
ChEBI	CHEBI:59340
ChEMBL	ChEMBL1812200
ChemSpider	184727
ECHA InfoCard	100.114.714
PubChem CID	213032
UNII	V1C07OR6II
CompTox Dashboard (EPA)	DTXSID8034588
- InChI: InChI=1S/C22H18N2O4/c1-22(16-12-14-19(15-13-16)27-18-10-6-3-7-11-18)20(25)24(21(26)28-22)23-17-8-4-2-5-9-17/h2-15,23H,1H3 Key: PCCSBWNGDMYFCW-UHFFFAOYSA-N; InChI=1/C22H18N2O4/c1-22(16-12-14-19(15-13-16)27-18-10-6-3-7-11-18)20(25)24(21(26)28-22)23-17-8-4-2-5-9-17/h2-15,23H,1H3 Key: PCCSBWNGDMYFCW-UHFFFAOYAG
- SMILES: O=C2OC(C(=O)N2Nc1ccccc1)(c4ccc(Oc3ccccc3)cc4)C

Properties
Chemical formula	C_{22}H_{18}N_{2}O_{4}
Molar mass	374.396 g·mol^{−1}
Melting point	140.3-141.8 °C
- Except where otherwise noted, data are given for materials in their standard state (at 25 °C [77 °F], 100 kPa). verify (what is ?) Infobox references

Famoxadone is a fungicide to protect agricultural products against various fungal diseases on fruiting vegetables, tomatoes, potatoes, cucurbits, lettuce and grapes. It is used in combination with cymoxanil. Famoxadone is a Q_{o}I, albeit with a chemistry different from most Q_{o}Is. (It is an oxazolidine-dione while most are strobilurins.) It is commonly used against Plasmopara viticola, Alternaria solani, Phytophthora infestans, and Septoria nodorum.

== Molecular interaction ==
Famoxadone is of lesser interaction strength at the Q_{p} pocket than some other Q_{o}Is, for example, azoxystrobin. This is because azoxystrobin and such interact more centrally in the Q_{p} pocket than does famoxadone.

== Resistance management ==
Although it has a different chemistry, famoxadone shows full cross-resistance with the rest of the main FRAC group 11 that it belongs to, which is almost entirely strobilurins. It has not shown cross-resistance with the 11A subgroup however. As with all Q_{o}Is there is a high risk of resistance development and so pesticide stewardship is important.

Populations of P. infestans and A. solani in northern and western Europe are not known to be resistant to famoxadone.

== Great Britain approval withdrawn ==
On June 30 2024, approval for famoxadone's use in Great Britain was withdrawn by the Health and Safety Executive due to the risk it presents to birds. Its use was already banned in the European Union, and there was in 2024 concern about the levels of allowed residue particularly on table grapes being too high.
