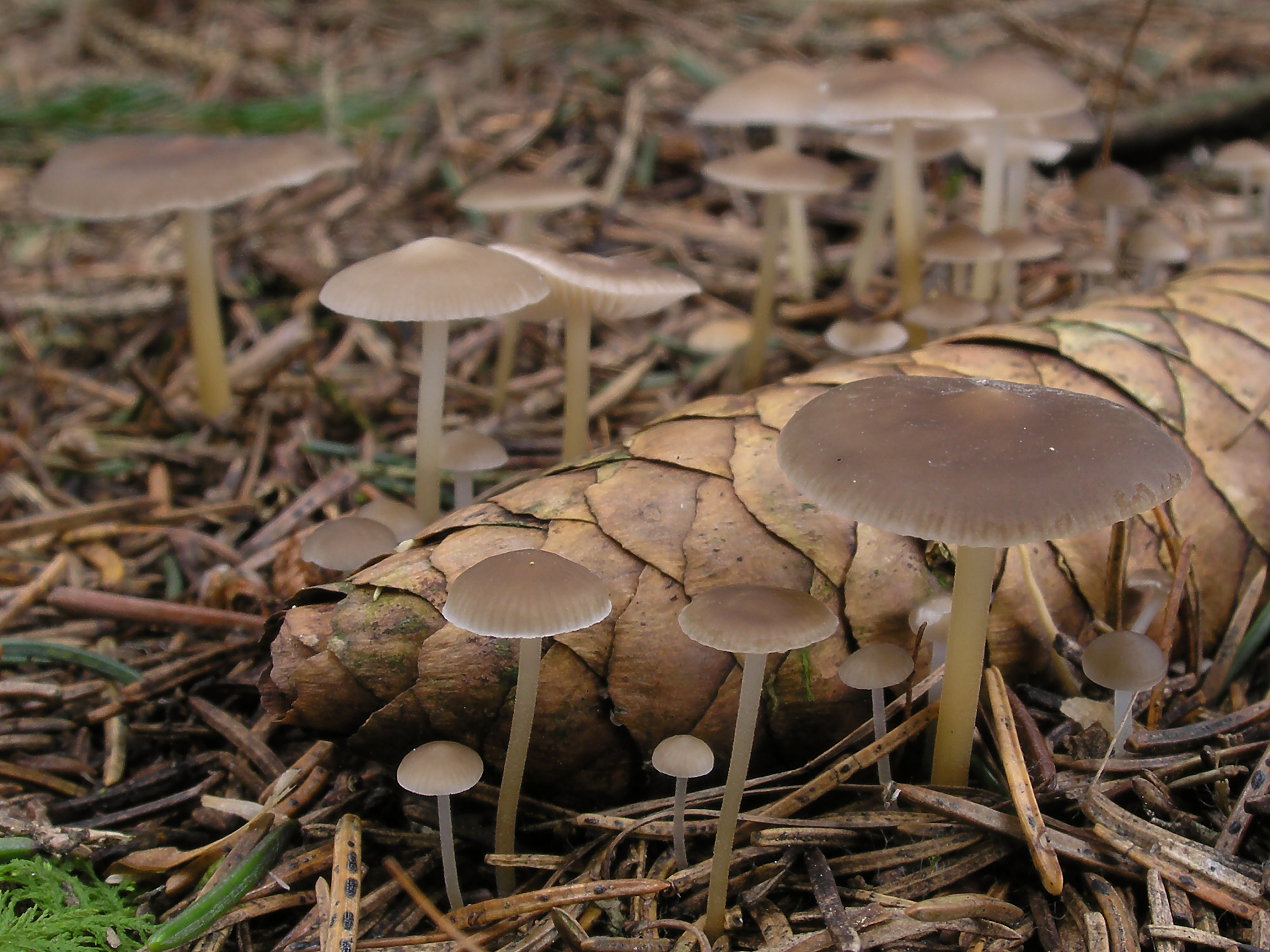
- Strobilurus esculentus

Scientific classification
- Domain: Eukaryota
- Kingdom: Fungi
- Division: Basidiomycota
- Class: Agaricomycetes
- Order: Agaricales
- Family: Physalacriaceae
- Genus: Strobilurus; Singer (1962)

= Strobilurus (fungus) =

Genus of fungi

Strobilurus is a genus of fungi in the family Physalacriaceae. The genus has a widespread distribution in temperate regions, and contains 10 species. Species of Strobilurus grow on pine cones.

== Species ==
- S. albipilatus
- S. conigenoides
- S. diminutivus
- S. esculentus
- S. kemptoniae
- S. occidentalis
- S. ohshimae
- S. stephanocystis
- S. tenacellus
- S. tephanocystis
- S. trullisatus
- S. wyomingensis
