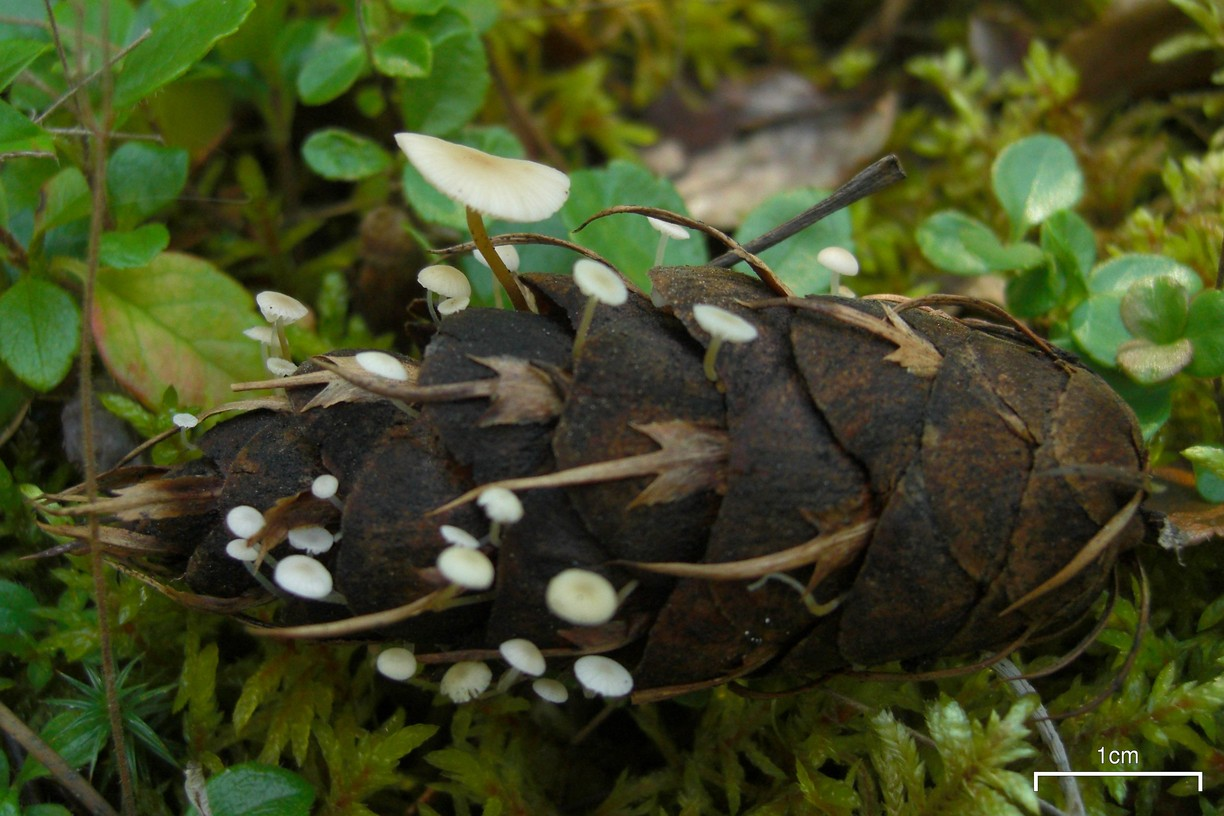

Scientific classification
- Kingdom: Fungi
- Division: Basidiomycota
- Class: Agaricomycetes
- Order: Agaricales
- Family: Physalacriaceae
- Genus: Strobilurus
- Species: S. trullisatus

Binomial name
- Strobilurus trullisatus (Murrill) Lennox (1979)

Synonyms
- Gymnopus trullisatus Murrill (1916)

= Strobilurus trullisatus =

Species of fungus

Strobilurus trullisatus
- Mycological characteristics
- Gills on hymenium
- Cap is convex
- Hymenium is adnexed
- Stipe is bare
- Spore print is white
- Ecology is saprotrophic
- Edibility is unknown

Strobilurus trullisatus is a species of agaric fungus in the family Physalacriaceae. It is native to the Pacific Northwest, where it grows on Douglas-fir cones.

== Description ==
The fruiting bodies grow in clusters on the cones of the Douglas-fir. They feature a thin, white cap ranging from 4–17 mm (0.16–0.67 in) wide. It has gills that are adnate to adnexed, close, and white to pinkish-tan. The stipe ranges from 15–45 mm (0.59–1.77 in) with a diameter ranging from 1–2 mm (0.039–0.079 in). The spore print is white.

=== Similar species ===
It can resemble S. occidentalis and S. wyomingensis, which grow on spruce cones.
