= Fenamidone =

Names
- Preferred IUPAC name (5S)-3-Anilino-5-methyl-2-(methylsulfanyl)-5-phenyl-3,5-dihydro-4H-imidazol-4-one

Identifiers
CAS Number	161326-34-7
3D model (JSmol)	Interactive image
ChEBI	CHEBI:83258
ChemSpider	8578637
ECHA InfoCard	100.122.945
PubChem CID	10403199
UNII	DN24MG2Z5E
CompTox Dashboard (EPA)	DTXSID2034590
- InChI: InChI=1S/C17H17N3OS/c1-17(13-9-5-3-6-10-13)15(21)20(16(18-17)22-2)19-14-11-7-4-8-12-14/h3-12,19H,1-2H3/t17-/m0/s1 Key: LMVPQMGRYSRMIW-KRWDZBQOSA-N; InChI=1/C17H17N3OS/c1-17(13-9-5-3-6-10-13)15(21)20(16(18-17)22-2)19-14-11-7-4-8-12-14/h3-12,19H,1-2H3/t17-/m0/s1 Key: LMVPQMGRYSRMIW-KRWDZBQOBL
- SMILES: O=C2N(Nc1ccccc1)C(\SC)=N/[C@]2(c3ccccc3)C

Properties
Chemical formula	C_{17}H_{17}N_{3}OS
Molar mass	311.40 g·mol^{−1}
Melting point	136-138 °C
- Except where otherwise noted, data are given for materials in their standard state (at 25 °C [77 °F], 100 kPa). verify (what is ?) Infobox references

Fenamidone is a foliar fungicide used on grapes, ornamentals, potatoes, tobacco, and vegetables such as tomatoes. It exerts its fungicidal effects by acting as a Q_{o} inhibitor.
