= Metyltetraprole =

Fungicide

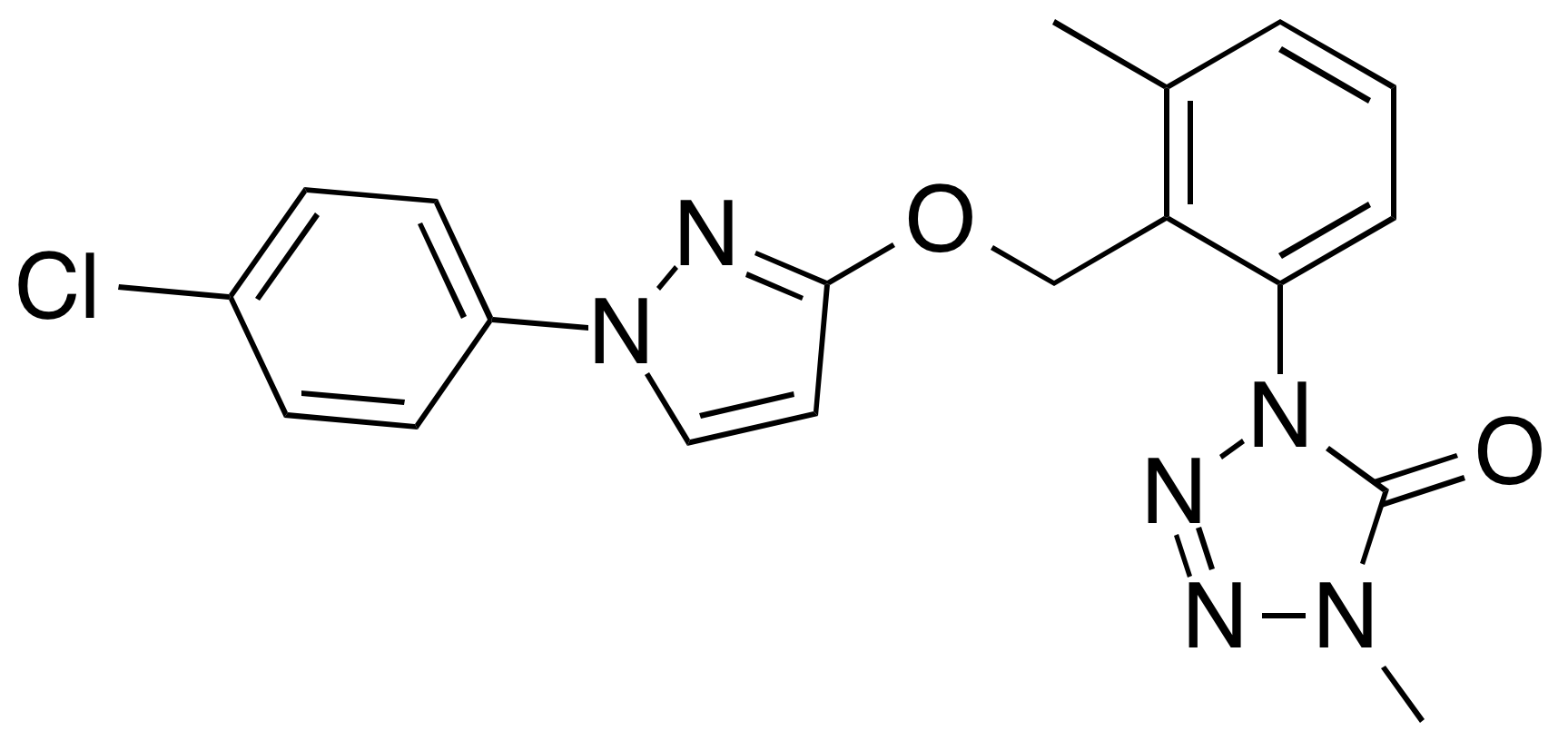

Names
- IUPAC name 1-[2-[[1-(4-chlorophenyl)pyrazol-3-yl]oxymethyl]-3-methylphenyl]-4-methyltetrazol-5-one

Identifiers
CAS Number	1472649-01-6
3D model (JSmol)	Interactive image
ChEBI	CHEBI:141152
ChemSpider	62285803
PubChem CID	89881183
UNII	44WE6KNK7M
CompTox Dashboard (EPA)	DTXSID601108889
- InChI: InChI=1S/C19H17ClN6O2/c1-13-4-3-5-17(26-19(27)24(2)22-23-26)16(13)12-28-18-10-11-25(21-18)15-8-6-14(20)7-9-15/h3-11H,12H2,1-2H3 Key: XUQQRGKFXLAPNV-UHFFFAOYSA-N
- SMILES: CC1=C(C(=CC=C1)N2C(=O)N(N=N2)C)COC3=NN(C=C3)C4=CC=C(C=C4)Cl

Properties
Chemical formula	C_{19}H_{17}ClN_{6}O_{2}
Molar mass	396.84 g·mol^{−1}
- Except where otherwise noted, data are given for materials in their standard state (at 25 °C [77 °F], 100 kPa). Infobox references

Metyltetraprole is a quinone outside inhibitor fungicide sold under the brand name Pavecto by its inventor, Sumitomo Chemical. It is the only tetrazolinone fungicide and the only one in the Fungicide Resistance Action Committee's subgroup 11A.

== Development ==
Metyltetraprole was developed specifically to find an a.i. with the same mode of action (a Q_{o}I) but with sufficiently different chemistry as to avoid "critical" Q_{o}I resistance increasing around the world.

== Target pathogens ==
Metyltetraprole is highly effective against Alternaria triticina.

== Resistance ==
Developed because of increasing resistance to the main group of Q_{o}Is. See Development above.

=== Cross-resistance ===
It does not suffer cross-resistance with the resistance against 11 conferred by the cytochrome b mutation G143A. Cross-resistance against F129L is unassessed.

== Binding Mode ==
The structure of the tetrazolinone pharmacophore is very similar to the triazolone pharmacophore of an inhibitor developed by AgoEva, for which the binding mode has been elucidated in the structure deposited as 3L73 in the protein databank.
