= Oxazolidine =

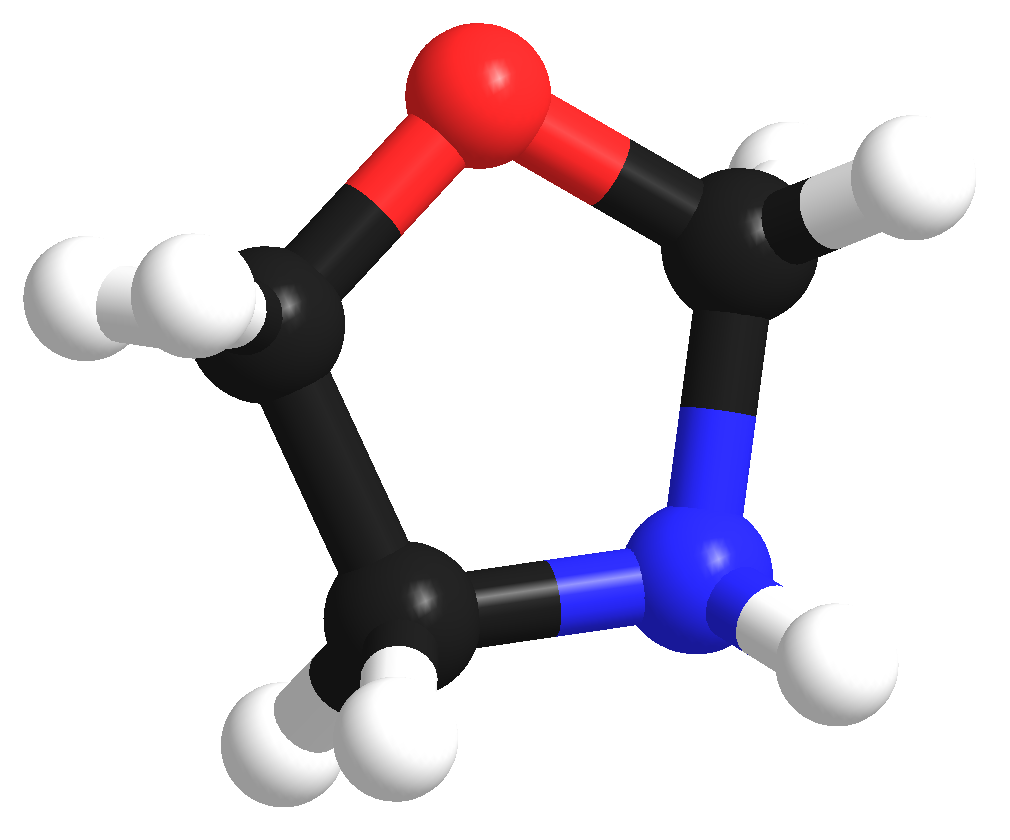

Names
- Preferred IUPAC name 1,3-Oxazolidine
- Other names Oxazolidine

Identifiers
CAS Number	504-76-7
3D model (JSmol)	Interactive image
Beilstein Reference	102468
ChEBI	CHEBI:50310
ChEMBL	ChEMBL4297314
ChemSpider	467457
ECHA InfoCard	100.127.875
EC Number	610-533-6
MeSH	C064210
PubChem CID	536683
UNII	13F52UF6MR
CompTox Dashboard (EPA)	DTXSID50198446
- InChI: InChI=1S/C3H7NO/c1-2-5-3-4-1/h4H,1-3H2 Key: WYNCHZVNFNFDNH-UHFFFAOYSA-N; InChI=1/C3H7NO/c1-2-5-3-4-1/h4H,1-3H2 Key: WYNCHZVNFNFDNH-UHFFFAOYAQ
- SMILES: C1COCN1

Properties
Chemical formula	C_{3}H_{7}NO
Molar mass	73.0938 g/mol
Appearance	colorless liquid
Density	1.063 g/mL
Melting point	90 °C (194 °F; 363 K)
Boiling point	200 °C (392 °F; 473 K) 20 torr
- Except where otherwise noted, data are given for materials in their standard state (at 25 °C [77 °F], 100 kPa). verify (what is ?) Infobox references

Oxazolidine is a five-membered heterocycle ring with the formula (CH_{2})_{3}(NH)O.The O atom and NH groups are not mutually bonded, in contrast to isoxazolidine. Oxazolidines (emphasis on plural) are derivatives of the parent oxazolidine owing to the presence of substituents on carbon and/or nitrogen. Oxazolines are unsaturated analogues of oxazolidines.

== Synthesis and reactions ==
First synthesized in the 1800s, oxazolidines are traditionally prepared by condensation of 2-aminoalcohols with aldehydes and ketones. The ready availability of chiral amino alcohols by reduction of amino acids enables the synthesis of chiral oxazolidines.

Non N-alkylated oxazolidines are prone to hydrolysis, resulting in a ring opening into the parent aminoalcohol. Perhaps for this reason, their basicity is rarely discussed. Since the reaction is an equillbrium, removal of water favours ring formation.

== Uses and occurrence ==
Several oxazolidine derivatives occur naturally, Some occur as post translational modifications of proteins. Others are components of alkaloids, a few of which are highly active against some tumors. Examples include terazomine, quinocarcin, and tetrahydroisoquinoline. Oxazolidines are also used as moisture scavengers in polyurethane and other systems.

Oxazolidines have been computationally studied as fuel additives. Various N-acetyl oxazolidines has been shown to have mosquito repellent properties. Hydrolysis of the oxazolidine ring makes it a promising pro-drug candidate for 1,2-aminoalcohols, a structural motif found in numerous FDA approved drugs.

== Bisoxazolidines ==
Bisoxazolidines contain two oxazolidine rings. They are the saturated analogues of bisoxazolines.

They are used as performance modifiers in polyurethane coatings and paints. The rings hydrolyze in the presence of moisture to give amine and hydroxyl groups, which can then react with diisocyanates, polyisocyanates and polyurethane prepolymers to form a coating. The amine groups will form urea linkages and the hydroxyl group will form urethane links. The use of a bisoxazolidine in a polyurethane system can prevent the unwanted reaction between isocyanate and moisture resulting in coating defects, as a result of carbon dioxide release. This moisture-triggered curing route is preferential to moisture cure. As the ring opening reaction is catalyzed by acids, usually organic acids or anhydrides of carboxylic acids are added in a small amount.

The choice of linker between the two oxazolidine rings has a large impact on the performance when used to cure isocyanates. A rigid linker group increases a polyurethanes toughness. A flexible linker group imparts flexibility and increases elongation of a coating. These differences are the reason why bisoxazolidines are used to enhance the performance of polyurethane systems. Usually the rings are linked by esters, urethanes, carbonate or have the two rings fused together. A key intermediate in manufacturing bisoxazolidines is 2-[2-(propan-2-yl)-1,3-oxazolidin-3-yl]ethanol. The hydroxy group on the molecule allows for further reaction with hexamethylene diisocyanate for example.

Depending on the linker, bisoxazolines can function as chelating ligands.

== See also ==
- Isoxazolidine, isomeric with oxazolidine
- Isoxazoline, isomeric with oxazoline
- Oxazolidinediones, which have two in-cycle keto groups
- Oxazolidinones, which have an in-cycle carbonyl
- Oxazoline, which has only one double bond
- Dioxooxazolidines are oxazolidines where the carbon centers at the 1 and 3 positions are carbonyls. Some are commercial fungicides including chlozolinate, vinclozolin, and famoxadone.
