= QoI =

Kind of chemicals used to kill fungus

Famoxadone

Q_{o} inhibitors (Q_{o}I), or quinone outside inhibitors, are a group of fungicides used in agriculture. Some of these fungicides are among the most popular in the world. Q_{o}I are chemical compounds which act at the quinol outer binding site of the cytochrome bc_{1} complex.

Most Q_{o}I common names end in -strobin and so are often called strobs. Q_{o}I's are the resulting fusion of three fungicides families, the well-known family of strobilurins and two new families, represented by fenamidone and famoxadone. Some strobilurins are azoxystrobin, kresoxim-methyl, picoxystrobin, pyraclostrobin, and trifloxystrobin.

== Usage ==
QoI fungicides are used on a wide range of crops, such as cereals, vines, pome fruits, cucurbits, tomatoes, and potatoes.

For example, they are used as fungicides for cereals, against Erysiphe graminis f.sp tritici responsible for the powdery mildew in wheat or against Septoria tritici, responsible for septoria leaf spot in wheat.

They are also commonly used for vine culture, against Plasmopara viticola, responsible for downy mildew or in oïdium treatment.

== List ==
- Q_{o}Is:

- methoxy-acrylates:

- azoxystrobin
- coumoxystrobin
- enoxastrobin
- flufenoxystrobin
- picoxystrobin
- pyraoxystrobin

- methoxy-acetamides:

- mandestrobin

- methoxy-carbamates:

- pyraclostrobin
- pyrametostrobin
- triclopyricarb

- oximino-acetates:

- kresoxim-methyl
- trifloxystrobin

- oximino-acetamides:

- dimoxystrobin
- fenaminstrobin
- metominostrobin
- orysastrobin

- oxazolidine-diones:

- famoxadone

- dihydro-dioxazines:

- fluoxastrobin

- imidazolinones:

- fenamidone

- benzyl-carbamates:

- pyribencarb

- Q_{o}I subgroup A:

- tetrazolinones:

- metyltetraprole

== Resistance ==
=== Main group resistance ===
Almost all these fungicides are in the same cross-resistance group (FRAC 11) and must be managed carefully to avoid the appearance of fungicide resistance. All group 11s are cross-resistant with each other. Some fungicide resistance has been observed in many crop pathogens (such as in the case of wheat powdery mildew), so the application of Q_{o}I products should respect effective rates and intervals to provides time and space when the pathogen population is not influenced by the product selection pressure. Resistance to group 11 is conferred by cytochrome b mutations G143A and F129L, and by other mechanisms.

=== Tetrazolinone resistance ===
The tetrazolinones consist of only one molecule, metyltetraprole. This constitutes FRAC 11A. 11A is not cross-resistant with 11 resistance conferred by G143A.

== See also ==
- plant pathology
- integrated farming
