= Oxazolidinedione =

Oxazolidinedione may refer to:

- 2,4-Oxazolidinedione, parent of various drugs
- 2,5-Oxazolidinedione, also called glycine N-carboxyanhydride
