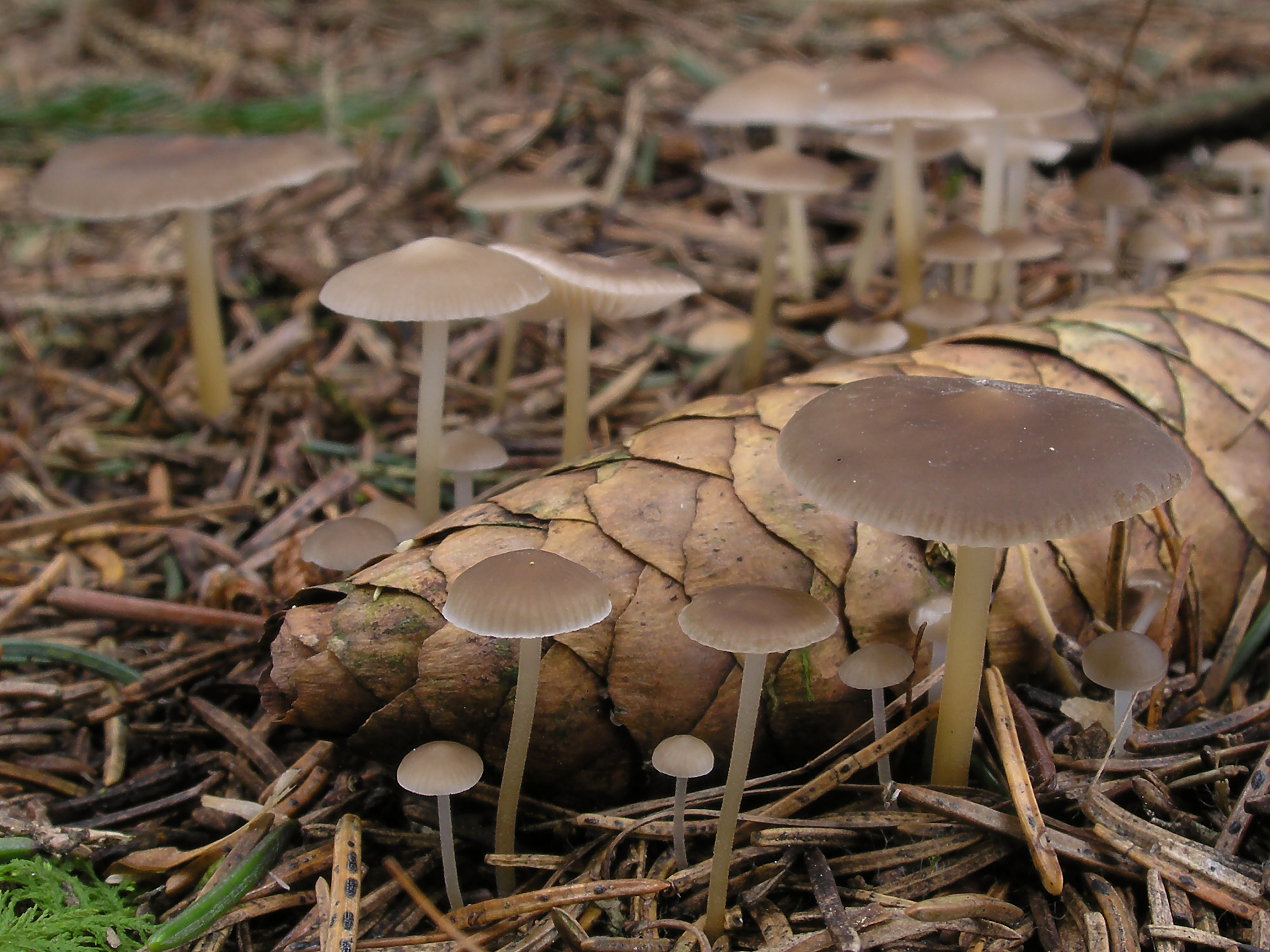

Scientific classification
- Kingdom: Fungi
- Division: Basidiomycota
- Class: Agaricomycetes
- Order: Agaricales
- Family: Physalacriaceae
- Genus: Strobilurus
- Species: S. esculentus

Binomial name
- Strobilurus esculentus (Wulfen) Singer (1962)

Synonyms
- Agaricus esculentus Wulfen (1782)

= Strobilurus esculentus =

Species of fungus

Strobilurus esculentus is a very common, edible mushroom of the genus Strobilurus. It can often be found in the spring on and around fallen spruce cones.

== Description ==
The cap is convex, brownish grey, and grows 1 to 3 cm in diameter. It can also be off-white or brownish-black. The gills are crowded, white, and somewhat sinuate. The spores are white. The stem is brownish-grey with a pale apex.
