= FMX (conference) =

Conference for animation, effects, interactive and immersive media

- FMX
- Status: Active
- Genre: Conference for animation, effects, interactive and immersive media
- Country: Germany
- Inaugurated: 1994
- Most recent: 2023 (Stuttgart)
- Next event: 2026 (Stuttgart)
- Organizer: Filmakademie Baden-Württemberg

FMX – Film & Media Exchange is one of Europe's most influential conferences dedicated to animation, effects, interactive and immersive media organized by Filmakademie Baden-Württemberg. It takes place at Haus der Wirtschaft in Stuttgart every spring., presenting top-notch speakers from all over the world like Volker Engel, Jan Pinkava, Douglas Trumbull, Ed Hooks, Regina Pessoa, Georgina Hayns, Andy Serkis, Roland Emmerich and Dave McKean.

== History ==
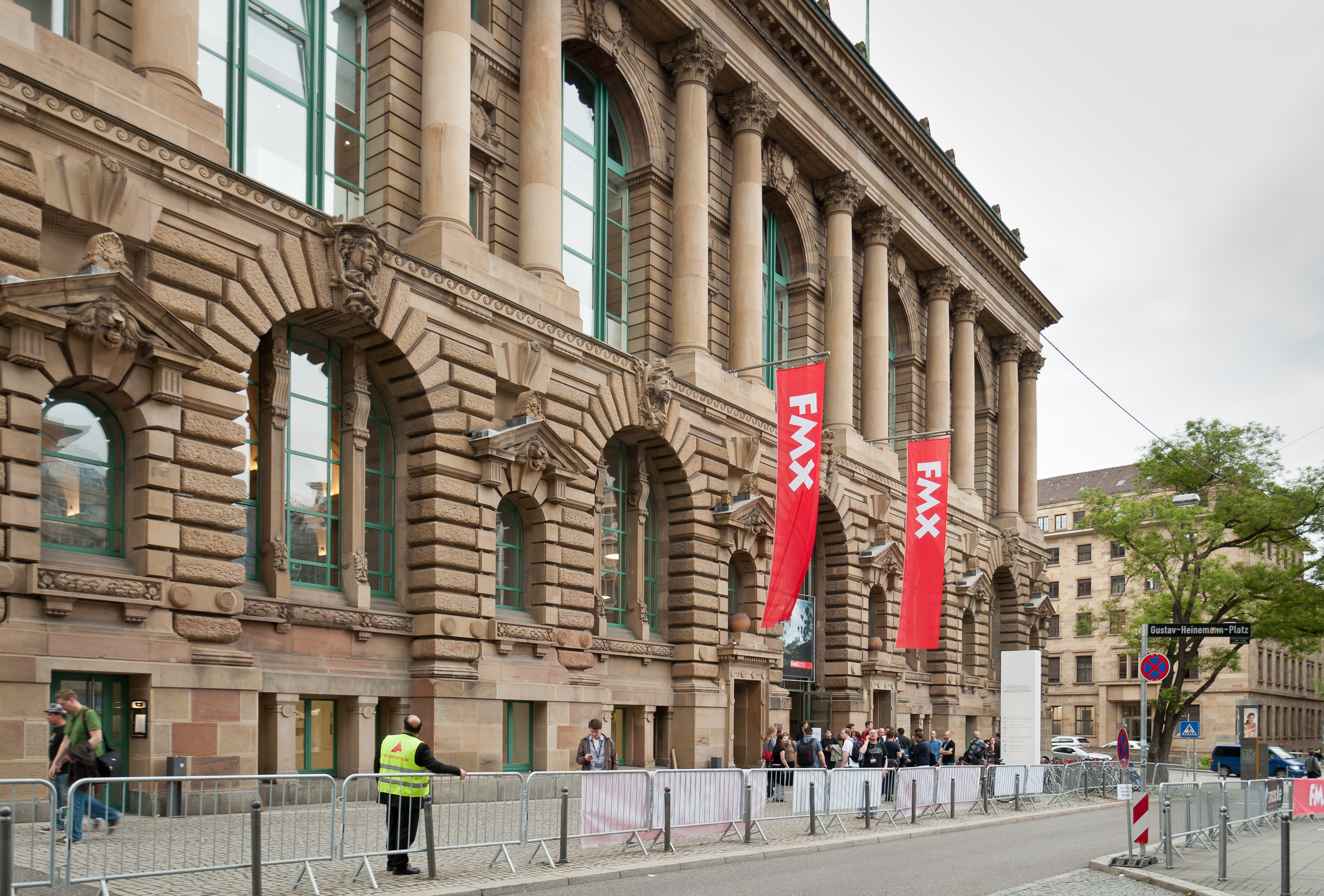
Haus der Wirtschaft, home of FMX, photographed in 2012

FMX was originally founded for students in 1994. Today, it is run in co-operation with SIGGRAPH. In 2023 FMX welcomed around 4,000 visitors. Talks included presentations on Guillermo del Toro's Pinocchio, All Quiet on the Western Front (2022 film), Avatar: The Way of Water, The Sandman (TV series), Kleo, and Stranger Things (season 4). FMX was described by Forbes magazine in January 2020 as one of the "global events getting immersive [entertainment] right"

In 2021 FMX hosted its first online edition, offering an entirely virtual conference program dedicated to the central theme "ReImagine Tomorrow".

As a hybrid event, FMX was held in 2023 with three days on-site and a fourth day online.

The next edition of FMX will take place from April 23 to 26, 2024 – returning to four full days on site.

=== APD ===
The Animation Production Days are a joint venture of FMX with the Stuttgart International Festival of Animated Film (ITFS). business platform for the animation industry, bringing together financing, distribution and co-production partners for animation projects. APD also organise the APD talent program, in which young producers and recent graduates can submit projects at little or no cost.

== Funding ==
FMX is supported financially by the Ministry of Science, Research and Arts and the Ministry of Economic Affairs, Labour and Tourism of the State of Baden-Wuerttemberg, as well as the City of Stuttgart and also Medien- und Filmgesellschaft Baden-Württemberg.

== See also ==
- ACM SIGGRAPH
