= Pyraclostrobin =

Agricultural fungicide, QoI, strobilurin

Names
- IUPAC name Methyl N-[2-[[1-(4-chlorophenyl)pyrazol-3-yl]oxymethyl]phenyl]-N-methoxycarbamate
- Other names Pyraclostrobine

Identifiers
CAS Number	175013-18-0
3D model (JSmol)	Interactive image
ChEBI	CHEBI:78780
ChEMBL	ChEMBL519873
ChemSpider	4928348
ECHA InfoCard	100.125.533
EC Number	605-747-1
KEGG	C18561
PubChem CID	6422843
UNII	DJW8M9OX1H
CompTox Dashboard (EPA)	DTXSID7032638
- InChI: InChI=1S/C19H18ClN3O4/c1-25-19(24)23(26-2)17-6-4-3-5-14(17)13-27-18-11-12-22(21-18)16-9-7-15(20)8-10-16/h3-12H,13H2,1-2H3 Key: HZRSNVGNWUDEFX-UHFFFAOYSA-N
- SMILES: COC(=O)N(C1=CC=CC=C1COC2=NN(C=C2)C3=CC=C(C=C3)Cl)OC

Properties
Chemical formula	C_{19}H_{18}ClN_{3}O_{4}
Molar mass	387.82 g·mol^{−1}

Hazards
- GHS labelling
Pictograms	(GHS06: Toxic) (GHS07: Exclamation mark) (GHS09: Environmental hazard)
Signal word	Danger
Hazard statements	H315, H331, H335, H410
Precautionary statements	P261, P264, P271, P273, P280, P302+P352, P304+P340, P311, P312, P321, P332+P313, P362, P391, P403+P233, P405, P501
- Except where otherwise noted, data are given for materials in their standard state (at 25 °C [77 °F], 100 kPa). Infobox references

Pyraclostrobin is a quinone outside inhibitor (Q_{o}I)-type fungicide used in agriculture. Among the Q_{o}Is, it lies within the strobilurin chemical class.

== Use ==
Pyraclostrobin is used to protect Fragaria, Rubus idaeus, Vaccinium corymbosum, Ribes rubrum, Ribes uva-crispa, blackberry (various Rubus spp.), and Pistachio vera.

== Target pathogens ==
Pyraclostrobin is used against Botrytis cinerea and Alternaria alternata.

== Resistance ==
Resistant populations have been identified in:

- Botrytis cinerea on Fragaria in the Carolinas, conferred by the G143A mutation in the partial cytochrome b (CYTB) gene.
- Botrytis cinerea on Fragaria, Rubus idaeus, Vaccinium corymbosum, Ribes rubrum, Ribes uva-crispa, and blackberry (various Rubus spp.) in Northern Germany.
- Botrytis cinerea on Fragaria in Florida.
- Alternaria alternata on Pistachio vera in California.

== Geography of use ==
=== United States ===
Pyraclostrobin was widely used throughout the United States as of 2017, but especially in the Upper Midwest.

== Off-target toxicity ==
Although toxic, and recommended to be avoided by humans, pyraclostrobin is of temporary and low toxicity, that is to say it is merely an irritant of eyes and skin. It does cause some degree of reproductive and developmental failure in mammals but does not absorb well through the skin. It is likely to bioaccumulate in aquatic organisms.

== Residues in diet ==
Pyraclostrobin does not accumulate in foods to a significant degree.

== Biodegradability ==
Pyraclostrobin is described by one source as not very biodegradable, and by another as possibly significantly biodegradable.
