= Difenoconazole =

Names
- IUPAC name 1-[[2-[2-Chloro-4-(4-chlorophenoxy)phenyl]-4-methyl-1,3-dioxolan-2-yl]methyl]-1,2,4-triazole

Identifiers
CAS Number	119446-68-3
3D model (JSmol)	Interactive image
ChEBI	CHEBI:81760
ChEMBL	ChEMBL466426
ChemSpider	77730
ECHA InfoCard	100.106.375
EC Number	601-613-1
KEGG	C18459
PubChem CID	86173
CompTox Dashboard (EPA)	DTXSID4032372
- InChI: InChI=1S/C19H17Cl2N3O3/c1-13-9-25-19(27-13,10-24-12-22-11-23-24)17-7-6-16(8-18(17)21)26-15-4-2-14(20)3-5-15/h2-8,11-13H,9-10H2,1H3 Key: BQYJATMQXGBDHF-UHFFFAOYSA-N
- SMILES: CC1COC(O1)(CN2C=NC=N2)C3=C(C=C(C=C3)OC4=CC=C(C=C4)Cl)Cl

Properties
Chemical formula	C_{19}H_{17}Cl_{2}N_{3}O_{3}
Molar mass	406.26 g·mol^{−1}
Appearance	white
Odor	odorless
Density	1.39 g·cm^{−3}
Melting point	78.6 °C (173.5 °F; 351.8 K)
Boiling point	100.8 °C (213.4 °F; 373.9 K) (3.7 mPa)
Solubility in water	15 mg/L
Solubility	Soluble in acetone, dichloromethane, toluene, methanol and ethyl acetate
log P	4.4
Vapor pressure	3.3×10^{−5} mPa
Henry's law constant (k_{H})	8.9×10^{−12} atm·m^{3}·mol^{-1}
Acidity (pK_{a})	1.1 (20 °C)
Viscosity	529 cP

Hazards
- GHS labelling
Pictograms	(GHS07: Exclamation mark) (GHS08: Health hazard) (GHS09: Environmental hazard)
Signal word	Warning
Hazard statements	H302, H319, H351, H410
Precautionary statements	P203, P264, P264+P265, P270, P273, P280, P301+P317, P305+P351+P338, P318, P330, P337+P317, P391, P405, P501
- Except where otherwise noted, data are given for materials in their standard state (at 25 °C [77 °F], 100 kPa). Infobox references

Difenoconazole is an agricultural fungicide. Chemically, it is a mixture of several isomers of a chemical compound belonging to the group of triazoles and conazoles.

== Properties ==
Difenoconazole is a white, odorless solid that is practically insoluble in water. The technical-grade product is yellowish and has a faintly sweet odor. The compound is stable against photolysis and hydrolysis at pH values of 5, 7, and 9.

== Uses ==
Difenoconazole is a systemic triazole fungicide used to control a range of plant diseases affecting fruits, vegetables, and ornamental plants, including those caused by Ascomycetes, Basidiomycetes, and Deuteromycetes. It inhibits fungal ergosterol biosynthesis by blocking the C-14 demethylation of steroids, resulting in morphological and functional changes in the fungal cell membrane. The compound was introduced to the market in 1989. Its use in strawberry cultivation can reduce the aroma and flavor of the fruit.

== Legal status ==
In the European Union, the substance was included in Annex I of Directive 91/414/EEC concerning the placing of plant protection products on the market, pursuant to Directive 2008/69/EC.

In Germany, Austria, and Switzerland, plant protection products containing this active ingredient are approved.

In Switzerland, a relatively high residue limit in food of 10 milligrams of difenoconazole per kilogram applies, among other products, to basil and parsley.

== Stereoisomers ==
Due to the two stereocenters in the five-membered acetal ring, difenoconazole forms a cis-trans pair of racemic diastereomers. The mixture therefore consists of four stereoisomers: the (R,R)-, (S,S)-, (R,S)-, and (S,R)-forms. The ratio of diastereomers after synthesis is approximately 60% cis isomers [(R,S)- and (S,R)-forms] and 40% trans isomers [(R,R)- and (S,S)-forms].

Difenoconazole (4 stereoisomers)
(R,R) configuration	(S,S) configuration
(S,R) configuration	(R,S) configuration

== Synthesis ==
Difenoconazole can be obtained by ether reaction of 2,4-dichloroacetophenone with 4-chlorophenol, followed by bromination of the intermediate with elemental bromine, followed by the formation of an acetal with 1,2-propanediol and nucleophilic substitution with 1,2,4-triazole.

Synthesis of difenoconazole
