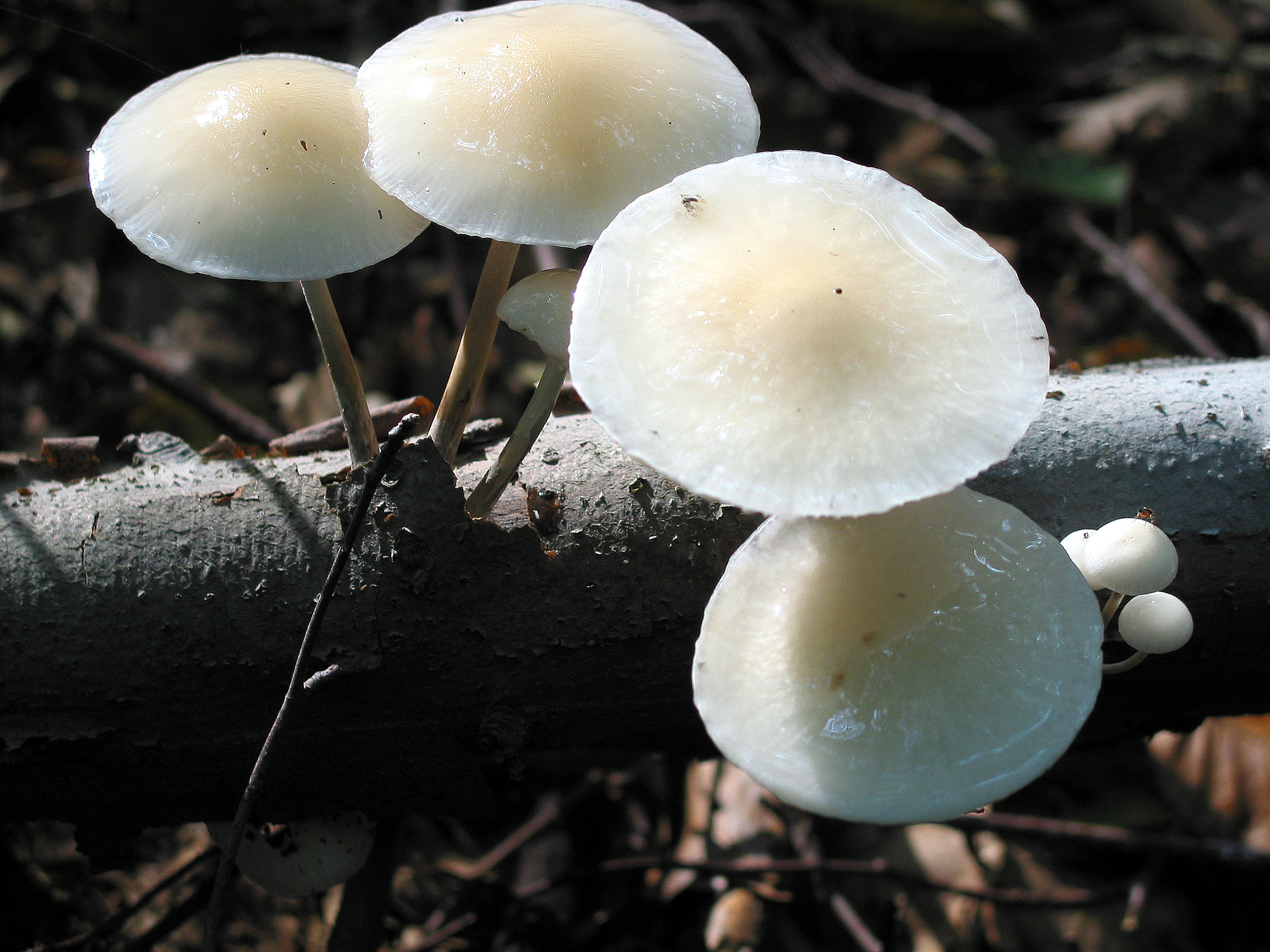

Scientific classification
- Kingdom: Fungi
- Division: Basidiomycota
- Class: Agaricomycetes
- Order: Agaricales
- Family: Physalacriaceae
- Genus: Oudemansiella
- Species: O. mucida

Binomial name
- Oudemansiella mucida (Schrad.) Hohn. (1794)

= Oudemansiella mucida =

Species of basidiomycete fungus

Oudemansiella mucida Mycological characteristics
- Gills on hymenium
- Cap is umbonate or convex
- Hymenium is adnexed
- Stipe has a ring
- Ecology is saprotrophic
- Edibility is edible

Oudemansiella mucida, commonly known as porcelain fungus, is a basidiomycete fungus of the family Physalacriaceae and native to Europe.

O. mucida is a white, slimy wood-rot fungus and is strongly tied to rotting beech, where it grows in clusters. It is in season late summer to late autumn, and tiny fungi can then sometimes be seen parachuting from high branches, when they are dislodged by the wind on breezy days.

== Taxonomy ==
Porcelain fungus has also been referred to as Beech Tuft, Poached Egg fungus or simply Porcelain Mushroom. Strongly tied to beech and being a delicate, white and slimy mushroom, it is reminiscent of porcelain or egg white; hence its English common names.

In 1794 Heinrich Adolf Schrader described the fungus and gave it the scientific name Agaricus mucidus. Its present accepted name dates from 1909, when Austrian mycologist ´Franz Xaver Rudolf von Höhnel transferred it to the genus Oudemansiella. The genus Oudemansiella was established in 1881 by Carlos Luigi Spegazzini and named in honour of the Dutch mycologist Cornelius Anton Jan Abraham Oudemans (1825–1906). The specific epithet mucida refers to the layer of transparent mucus that covers the caps of porcelain fungi. Synonyms of Oudemansiella mucida include Agaricus mucidus, Collybia mucida, Armillaria mucida and Mucidula mucida.

== Description ==
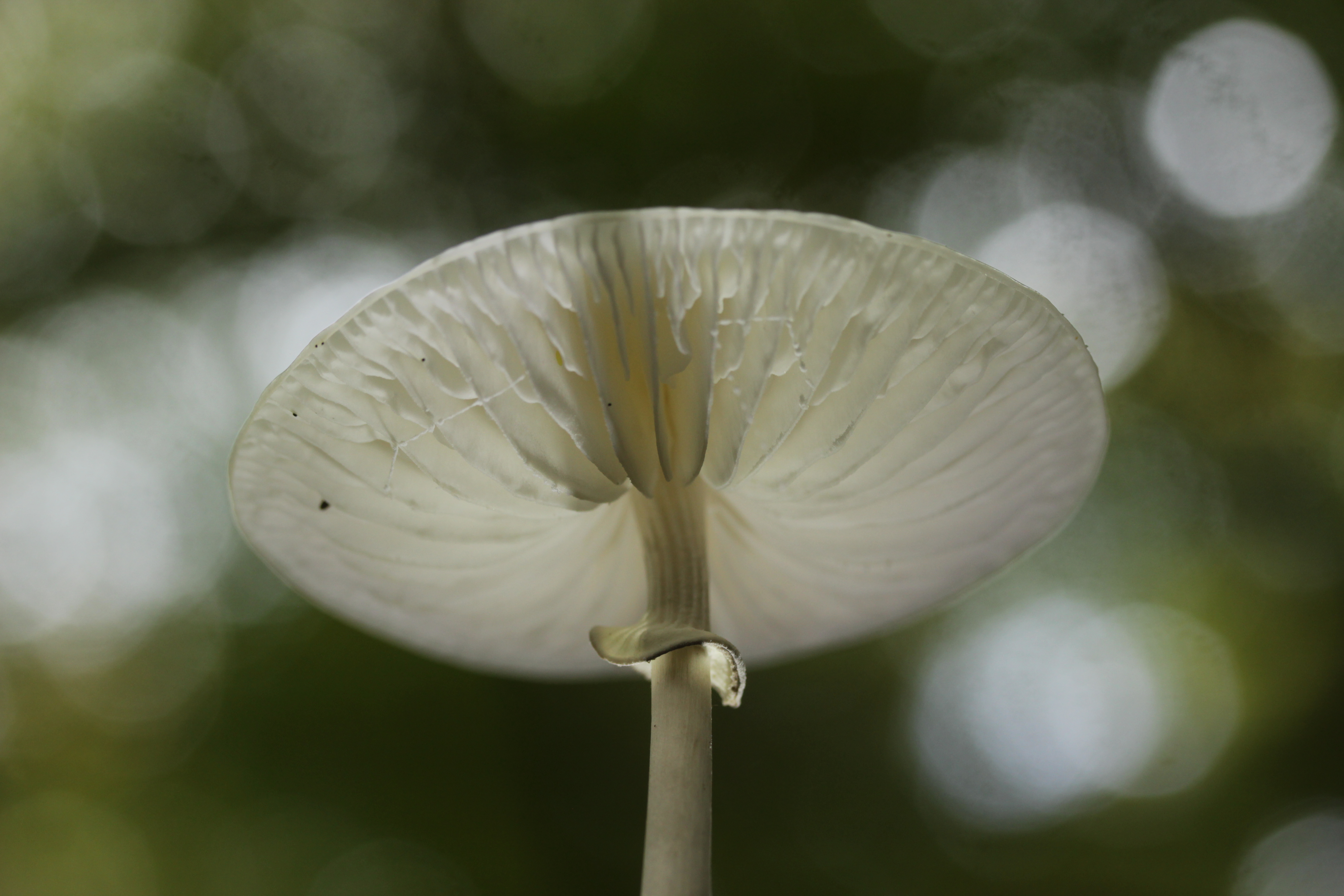
Underside showing lamellae and stem

Caps are 2–8 cm across, strongly convex at first, but mildly flattening over time. They are pale greyish when young, becoming whiter and covered with a semi-translucent and slimy membrane, often with an ochraceous flush at the centre. The surface layer resembles spore-bearing tissue, with erect club-shaped cells, but lacks functional basidia (i.e. cap cuticle is hymeniform).

The slender stems are 30–100 mm tall and 3–10 mm wide, white striate above a substantial membranous ring and slightly scaly and greyish below.

Flesh is thin and white and the lamellae are adnate, broad and very distant.

Cystidia are thin-walled cylindric or utriform. Spore print is white, they are smooth and subglobose in shape and very thickwalled at 13–18×12–15 μm.

When porcelain mushrooms grow from the underside of the tree, the stems will curl in a way so the caps are all held horizontally, with the gills facing down.

O. mucida are seldom confused with other fungi.

== Distribution and habitat ==
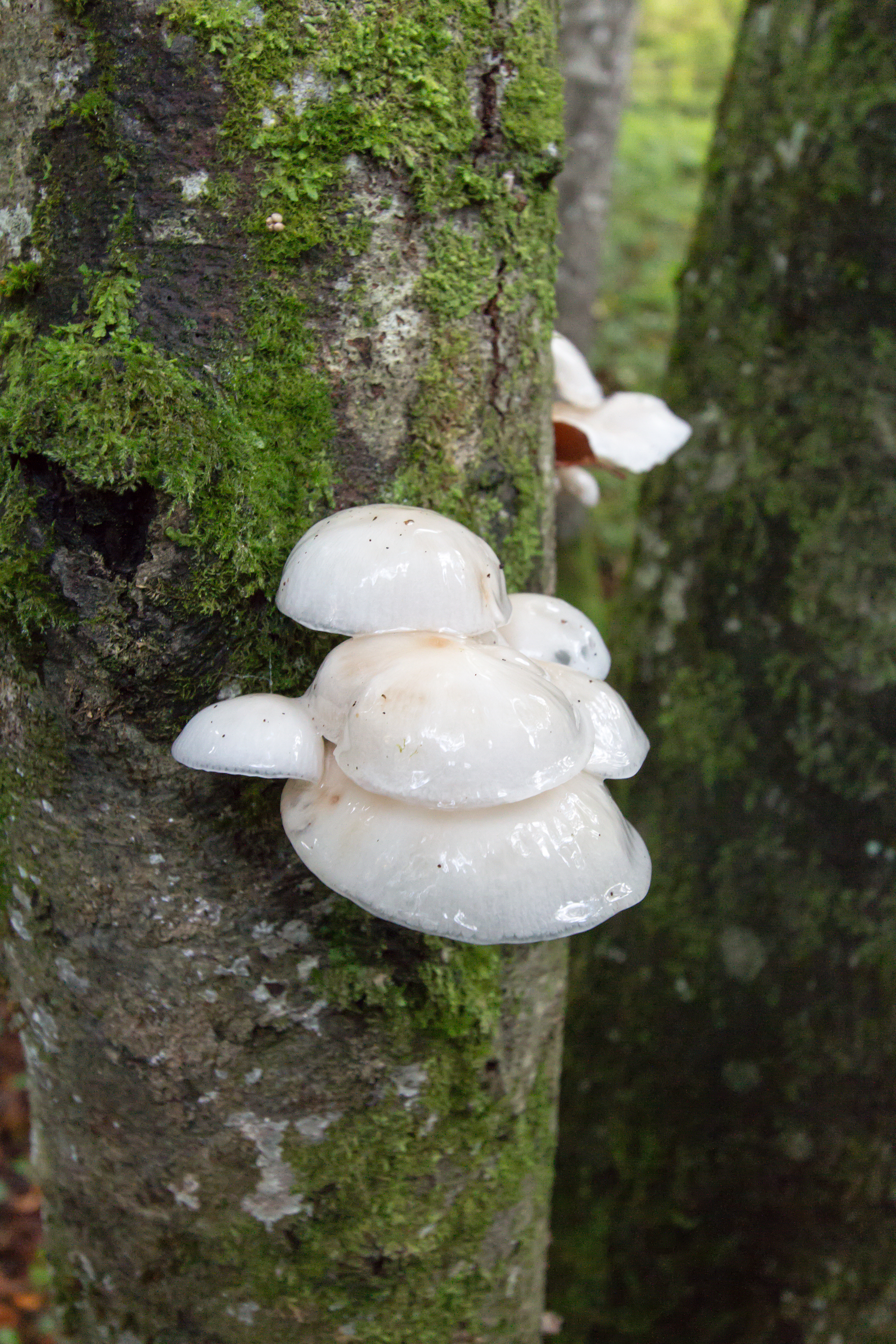
O. mucida on a beech trunk

Porcelain fungus is native to Europe, and specific to beech wood, where it appears in autumn on dead tree trunks and fallen branches, occasionally on dead branches high up in living trees. It is saprobic or weakly parasitic to living beech trees. While it has a strong tie to beech, it has been found growing on oak on rare occasions.

O. mucida occurs throughout northern and central Europe, where beech is found and in its habitat this fungus is a common species. When O. mucida is found on a beech tree, it usually outcompetes other fungi locally by means of a powerful anti-fungal agent called strobilurin.

== Chemistry ==
Porcelain fungus is generally not considered toxic. Some sources claim that it is mildly toxic though, while others consider it edible after washing (to remove the mucus). Still others, describe porcelain fungus as a good culinary mushroom and provide specific recipes for preparing it.

It has been discovered, that O. mucida releases a powerful fungicide that deters or even annihilates competitors. Known as strobilurins, these kinds of anti-fungal agents, have found use in the agricultural business as they protect crops from attacks by many Ascomycetes. Although subsequently improved upon by industrial chemists, the first strobilurin fungicides were isolated from wood-rotting mushroom fungi such as O. mucida and, in particular Strobilurus tenacellus; another white-spored, wood-rotting fungus.

== See also ==
- List of Oudemansiella species

== Sources ==
- Oudemansiella mucida Rogers Mushrooms
- Oudemansiella mucida (Schrad.) Höhn. - Porcelain Fungus First Nature
- Dictionary of the Fungi; Paul M. Kirk, Paul F. Cannon, David W. Minter and J. A. Stalpers; CABI, 2008
- Fascinated by Fungi, by Pat O'Reilly ISBN 978-0-9560544-3-2, 2011.
