= Strobilurin =

Group of chemical compounds

Strobilurins are a group of natural products and their synthetic analogs. A number of strobilurins are used in agriculture as fungicides. They are part of the larger group of Q_{o}Is (Quinone outside Inhibitors), which act to inhibit the respiratory chain at the level of Complex III.

The first parent natural products, strobilurins A and B, were extracted from the fungus Strobilurus tenacellus. Commercial strobilurin fungicides were developed through optimization of photostability and activity. Strobilurins represented a major development in fungus-based fungicides. First released in 1996, there are now ten major strobilurin fungicides on the market, which account for 23-25 % of the global fungicide sales. Examples of commercialized strobilurin derivatives are azoxystrobin, kresoxim-methyl, picoxystrobin, fluoxastrobin, oryzastrobin, dimoxystrobin, pyraclostrobin and trifloxystrobin.

Strobilurins are mostly contact fungicides with a long half time as they are absorbed into the cuticle and not transported any further. They have a suppressive effect on other fungi, reducing competition for nutrients; they inhibit electron transfer in mitochondria, disrupting metabolism and preventing growth of the target fungi.

== Natural strobilurins ==
=== Strobilurin A ===

Strobilurin A (also known as mucidin) is produced by Oudemansiella mucida, Strobilurus tenacellus, Bolinea lutea, and others. When first isolated it was incorrectly assigned as the E E E geometric isomer but was later identified by total synthesis as being the E Z E isomer, as shown.

==== 9-Methoxystrobilurin A ====
9-Methoxystrobilurin A is produced by Favolaschia spp.

=== Strobilurin B ===

Strobilurin B is produced by S. tenacellus.

=== Strobilurin C ===

Strobilurin C is produced by X. longipes and X. melanotricha.

=== Strobilurin D and G ===

Strobilurin D is produced by Cyphellopsis anomala. Its structure was originally incorrectly assigned and is now considered to be identical to that of strobilurin G, produced by B. lutea. A related material, hydroxystrobilurin D, with an additional hydroxyl group attached to the methyl of the main chain is produced by Mycena sanguinolenta.

=== Strobilurin E ===

Strobilurin E is produced by Crepidotus fulvotomentosus and Favolaschia spp.

=== Strobilurin F2 ===

Strobilurin F2 is produced by B. lutea.

=== Strobilurin H ===

Strobilurin H is produced by B. lutea. The natural product with a phenolic hydroxy group in place of the aromatic methoxy group of strobilurin H is called strobilurin F1 and is found in C. anomala and Agaricus spp.

=== Strobilurin X ===

Strobilurin X is produced by O. mucida.

=== Oudemansins ===
The oudemansins are closely related to the strobilurins and are also quinone outside inhibitors.

Oudemansin A with R_{1} = R_{2} = H was first described in 1979, after being isolated from mycelial fermentations of the basidiomycete fungus Oudemansiella mucida. Later it was found in cultures of the basidiomycete fungi Mycena polygramma and Xerula melanotricha. The latter fungus also produces oudemansin B, with R_{1} = MeO and R_{2} = Cl. Oudemansin X, with R_{1} = H and R_{2} = MeO was isolated from Oudemansiella radicata.

== Synthetic strobilurins ==
The discovery of the strobilurin class of fungicides led to the development of a group of commercial fungicides used in agriculture. Examples are shown below.

Azoxystrobin

Trifloxystrobin

Kresoxim methyl

Pyraclostrobin

== See also ==
- Plant pathology
