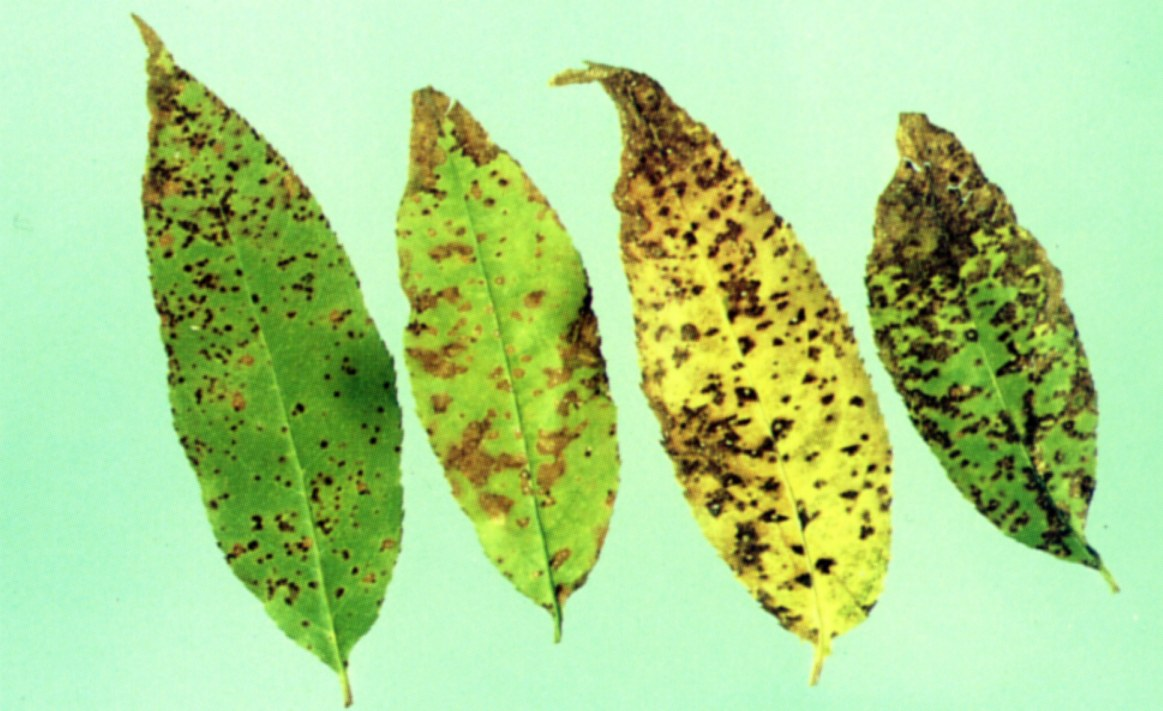
- Lesions on diseased leaves

Scientific classification
- Kingdom: Fungi
- Division: Ascomycota
- Class: Leotiomycetes
- Order: Helotiales
- Family: Drepanopezizaceae
- Genus: Blumeriella
- Species: B. jaapii

Binomial name
- Blumeriella jaapii F.A. Wolf (1914)

Synonyms
- Ascochyta padi Lib. (1832); Blumeriella hiemalis (B.B. Higgins) K. Põldmaa (1967); Blumeriella prunophorae (B.B. Higgins) Becer. (1983); Coccomyces hiemalis B.B. Higgins (1913); Coccomyces lutescens B.B. Higgins (1914); Coccomyces prunophorae B.B. Higgins (1914) [as 'prunophora']; Cylindrosporium hiemalis B.B. Higgins (1914); Cylindrosporium padi P. Karst. (1884) [1885]; Higginsia hiemalis (B.B. Higgins) Nannf. (1932); Higginsia jaapii (Rehm) Nannf. (1932); Higginsia lutescens (B.B. Higgins) Nannf. (1932); Higginsia prunophorae (B.B. Higgins) Nannf. (1932); Phloeosporella hiemalis (B.B. Higgins) K. Põldmaa (1967); Phloeosporella padi (Lib.) Arx (1961); Phlyctema padi (P. Karst.) Petr. (1920) [1919]; Pseudopeziza jaapii Rehm (1907); Septoria padi (Lib.) Thüm. (1874)

= Cherry leaf spot =

Plant fungal disease

Cherry leaf spot (Blumeriella jaapii) is a fungal disease which infects cherries and plums. Sweet, sour, and ornamental cherries are susceptible to the disease, being most prevalent in sour cherries. The variety of sour cherries that is the most susceptible are the English morello cherries. This is considered a serious disease in the Midwest, New England states, and Canada. It has also been estimated to infect 80 percent of orchards in the Eastern states. It must be controlled yearly to avoid a significant loss of the crop. If not controlled properly, the disease can dramatically reduce yields by nearly 100 percent. The disease is also known as yellow leaf or shothole disease to cherry growers due to the characteristic yellowing leaves and shot holes present in the leaves upon severe infection.

== Host and symptoms ==
Cherry leaf spot is caused by the ascomycete fungus Blumeriella jaapii (formerly known as Coccomyces hiemalis; anamorph Phloeosporella padi). This fungus overwinters in dead leaves on the ground as its main form of survival. In the spring, apothecia develop on these leaves. Ascospores are produced in these fungal fruiting bodies and are forcibly ejected during rainy periods for about 6–8 weeks, starting at petal fall. This is the teleomorph or sexual stage and results in new genetic recombination and variation for the disease.

This pathogen mainly affects and is most noticeable on the leaves of cherry trees. The most obvious symptom of this disease is the yellowing of leaves before they drop in the early spring. Infected leaves are filled with numerous black lesions that cover an obvious portion of the leaf. These lesions first appear as small purple spots which turn red to brown and then black. Most spots are circular but can amalgamate to form large, irregular dead patches. These spots tend to enlarge and separate from healthy tissue. Lastly, they drop out of the leaf giving a "shot-hole" appearance. This shot hole effect is more common on sour than on sweet cherries. In more severe and advanced cases, lesions are found on the fruit, petioles, and stems. Leaves with lesions present typically fall off early in the growing season and it is common for seriously affected trees to be defoliated by midsummer. Leaves severely infected by the disease turn very yellow before falling off.

If the disease is not controlled and allowed to persist for several years there could be various adverse effects to the overall cherry production of a tree primarily due to the cycle of early season and repeated defoliation. These effects include dwarfed and unevenly ripened fruit which has poor taste, trees more susceptible to winter injury, death of fruit spurs, small and weak fruit buds, decreased fruit size and set, and eventual death of the tree. If the disease has significantly infected the leaves enough in early spring it is possible that the fruit will fail to mature in that year. This fruit will typically remain light colored, soft, and very low in soluble solids and sugar.

== Disease cycle ==
=== Sexual reproduction ===
This fungus overwinters in dead leaves on the ground. In early spring (at the time of petal fall), fungal fruiting bodies called apothecia develop in these leaves. Ascospores produced in the apothecia are forcibly discharged into the air starting at petal fall. They can start new infections in new, green leaves and serve as the primary inoculum in each new growing season. The ascospores can stick to the leaf and, given a film of water and optimal temperature, germinate within hours of adhesion. Upon germination, hyphae can grow into the leaf via stomata (natural openings) on the underside of the leaf. Hyphae cannot invade immature stomata very effectively. After invasion, the hyphae grow in the intercellular spaces in the leaf, killing and feeding on leaf tissues. Incubation times vary with available moisture and temperature. The small purple lesions can appear within 5 days if there are damp conditions and the temperature remains steady between 60–68 °F (16–20 °C), or up to 15 days in lower temperatures and drier conditions. Leaves become less susceptible to infection as they age. The first sign of disease may be on the suckers close to the ground. Sexual reproduction is associated with the primary infection cycle of cherry leaf spot. Infection levels in this primary cycle are low, but essential for the success of the pathogen. Because the ascospores are produced through sexual reproduction, this part of the life cycle can also introduce genetic variation that may be important, for example, in the evolution of fungicide resistance.

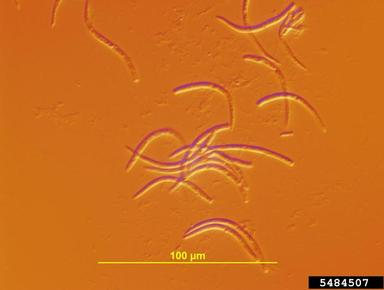
Conidia of cherry leaf spot

=== Asexual reproduction ===
Once these lesions from the primary infection have formed, there is the potential for secondary infections. Secondary or summer spores called conidia form in whitish patches on the undersides of leaves in tiny, concave fruiting bodies called acervuli. These conidia are horn-shaped and have hydrophilic outer cell walls that make them easily miscible in water. When spread during rain or by wind they can cause new leaf infections. Each conidium can multiply to form many additional conidia relatively quickly. When conditions are favorable, additional infections caused by conidia may overwhelm plant defenses, leading the plant to shed badly infected leaves. These secondary infections allow the disease to escalate into an epidemic very quickly. The conidia form through an asexual process, so all the conidia formed in one leaf spot are genetically identical. The fungus overwinters in diseased leaves on the ground, producing sexual spores in the Spring that infect the emerging leaves.

== Environment ==
The disease is generally distributed throughout the U.S., Canada, and various parts of the world where humid conditions occur. The cherry leaf spot fungus prefers moderately wet conditions, with temperatures above 60 °F (16 °C). Optimal temperature range for the spread of this fungus is between 60–68 °F (16–20 °C). Serious infection of a tree occurs in years with many rainy periods and cooler summers. Very few ascospores are ejected from the apothecia if the temperature is less than 46 °F (8 °C). This disease thrives in areas that do not use any type of sanitation practice as a preventative measure to prevent disease spread. When selecting a site for an orchard, use areas that have well drained soils, much sunlight, and good air circulation.

== Disease management ==
=== Resistance ===
There are no resistant varieties available on the commercial market yet. However, researchers have found the a wild type gene linked to the resistance. They are currently crossbreeding the wild lines with commercial cultivars and beginning to carry out field trials. No data is available yet.

=== Small or backyard growers ===
For small or backyard growers, collecting and destroying all leaf debris on the ground is an absolute necessity due to the potency of this disease because the fungus overwinters in this leftover leaf litter. This is its main form of survival. By removing and destroying these leaves, a grower can significantly decrease the amount of primary inoculum available in the spring. It will greatly decrease the apparent infection rate. There has also been a study done on the addition of a straw mulch bedding to the ground after all the leaves have been picked up. The addition of this mulch further reduced the spring infection rate. Leaf litter removal is not very practical for large commercial growers due labor needs and number of trees but if at all possible, a majority of the old leaves should try to be collected.

When planting, growers should select locations which have a large amount of direct sunlight such as a south facing slope. Proper pruning should also be completed to increase the amount of sunlight penetration and air circulation through the canopy. Any practice that increases the faster drying of leaves will help reduce the risk of infection. Growers may also consider making an after harvest fungicide application using a combination of Benomyl (50% WP) and Captan (50% WP) at rates of ¼ Tablespoon and 2 Tablespoons respectively per gallon of water. This will help reduce the rate at which pathogens may develop resistance to Benomyl products. Prior to shuck split, the recommended fungicide for cherry leaf spot is chlorothalonil (Bravo and generics). This fungicide is a multi-site protectant and is excellent for leaf spot control and is not at risk for fungicide resistance development. At least two applications of chlorothalonil should be made before shuck split with the goal to minimize the potential of infection at this early stage.

=== Commercial growers ===
For commercial growers, the disease is primarily controlled by use of fungicide sprays. Fungicides are much more effective when applied early in the season when the inoculum load is low as cherry leaf spot is a prolific, unrelenting, tireless disease.

Fungicide applications should begin at petal fall or shortly after leaves have unfolded. These sprays should continue on a schedule of every 7–10 days until harvest. Upon harvest, one or two postharvest applications should be administered, beginning 2–3 weeks after harvest. It is suggested that spraying alternate sides of trees on a 7-day program is more effective than spraying both sides of trees on a 10-day schedule.

Michigan State University suggests getting an early start on protection before the fungus starts infecting for the production year. This means that growers should spray at the bract leaf stage with chlorothalonil (Bravo and generics). These bract leaves open prior to bloom, which means bract leaves could be infected early, before petal fall. Typically the first fungicide application is recommended around petal fall, but due to the early and epidemic levels of infection in found in 2012, the first application should be applied earlier.

Significant infection was also found in the bract leaves in mid- to late June 2012. This was particularly surprising because the weather conditions were not notably conductive to the super development of cherry leaf spot infection. These early and significantly strong infection rates indicate that the fungus is evolving and becoming resistant to certain fungicide treatments. Control programs will need to be altered to keep up with the genetic advancement of the fungus. These earlier infections are a concern because once infection occurs; more spores will be produced from the lesions (conidia) than the leaf debris (ascospores) on the ground. These conidia are much more potent than ascospores in terms of infection rate.

In addition, spores from the lesions are much closer to new uninfected leaves than the spores from the leaf debris on the ground. Due to the smaller distance, infection will occur much quicker. George Sundin, a professor and fruit extension specialist from Michigan State University advocates that the new chemistries of succinate dehydrogenase inhibitors (SDHIs) are also effective in controlling cherry leaf spot. "Pristine" was registered in 2004. It is a premix of boscalid (SDHI) and pyraclostrobin (strobilurin). This has been indicated effective at a rate of 10.5 oz/acre. Other SDHIs that may be effective in cherry leaf spot control include fluopyram (a pyramide manufactured by Bayer under the name "Luna") and fluxapyroxad (a pyrazole-carboxamide manufactured by BASF under the name Merivon).

Sterol demethylation inhibitor (DMI) fungicides including fenarimol, fenbuconazole, myclobutanil, and tebuconazole were used immensely in the 1980s and 1990s. The efficacy of DMI fungicides has decreased dramatically in recent years and have not been used greatly since 2002.

In an effort to keep a high level of diversity in the cherry fungicide programs and reduce the amount of resistance building up to the DMI fungicides, copper based fungicides can be used with great efficacy to battle the fungus. However, the copper application is associated with noticeable leaf bronzing. There has been great concern that this bronzing causes a highly negative effect on the photosynthetic integrity of the leaves which in turn decreases the number of fruits per shoot, fresh fruit weight, and soluble solids concentration of the mature fruit. It has been scientifically proven that the standard application of copper based fungicides does not have any adverse effects on the developing fruit.

== Importance ==
Cherry leaf spot has been present in the United States and mainland Europe since the 19th century. It has only become common and a problem in the United Kingdom since the 1990s. The severity of the disease is very variable from year to year. In 1945 there was a serious outbreak in southern Pennsylvania. Trees began to defoliate early in the spring and eventually 25,000 trees died by the end of the growing season. This was 10 percent of Pennsylvania's cherry tree acreage at the time. Some trees were sprayed in 1945 at the end of the growing season and some trees were not. All of the trees that were sprayed in the fall of 1945 survived and produced fruit in 1946. Yields for the unsprayed trees that survived were 36 pounds per tree. Sprayed trees yielded nearly three times more than the controls with 107 pounds per tree. Additional research conducted in the 1940s demonstrated that it was absolutely necessary to monitor and control leaf spot through preventative sprays and measures. These experiments showed that poor control of the pathogen resulted in a 72 percent loss of tree branches for the growers who did not spray. Growers who used fungicides regularly and persistently commonly suffered no or very little loss from cherry leaf spot each year. More recent research studies have continued to support these findings. Work done by A. L. Jones in the 1980s and 1990s further quantified that fungicide applications reduced defoliation from 80% to 0.3% and from 98% to 3%.

Typical individual tree yields in 1992 in Michigan were approximately 80 pounds per tree, showing that spraying for the pathogen is definitely a worthwhile endeavor. The year 2012 was problematic for Michigan growers as the early warm weather and untimely rains caused the infection to take off much earlier compared to most years.
