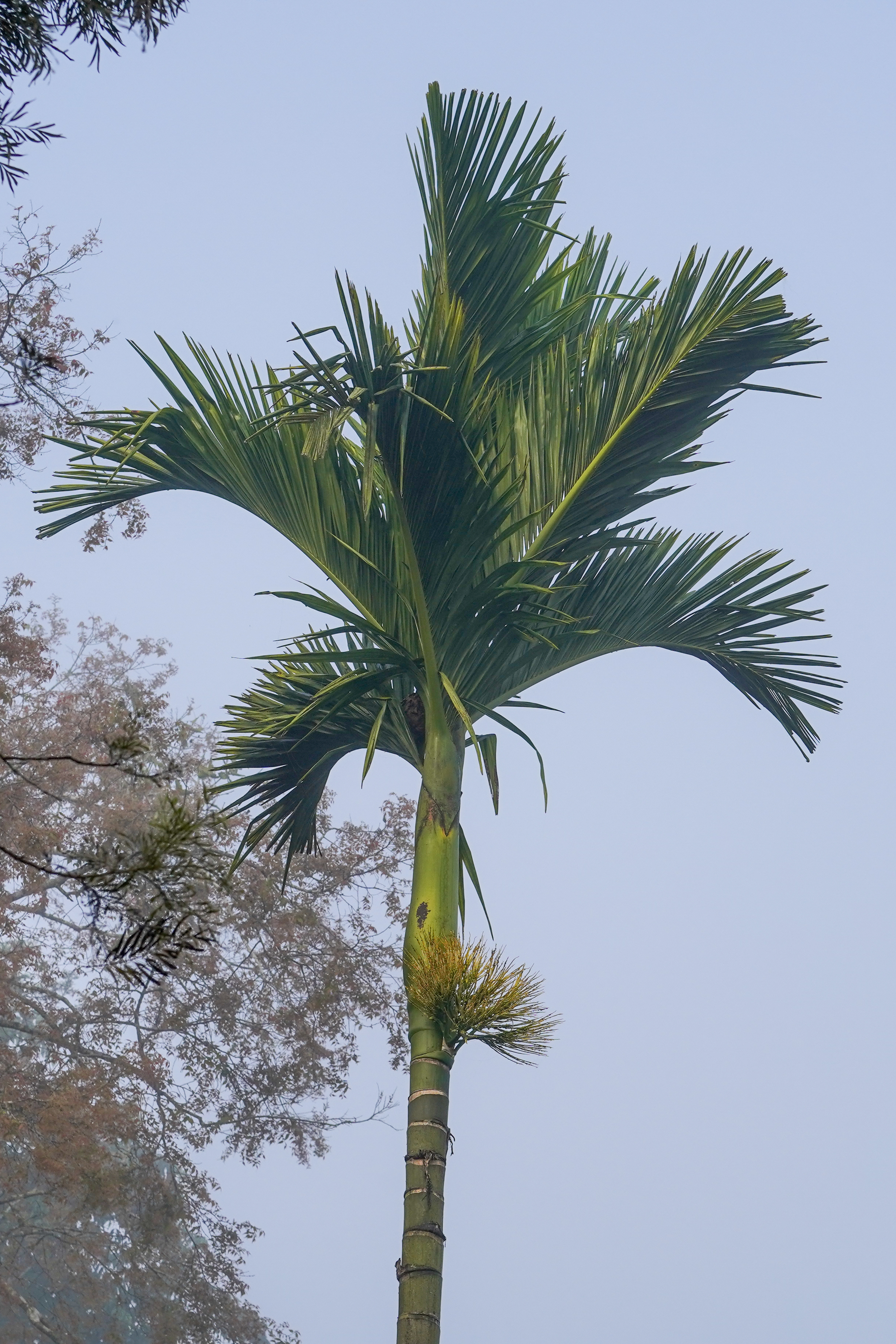
- A mature tree
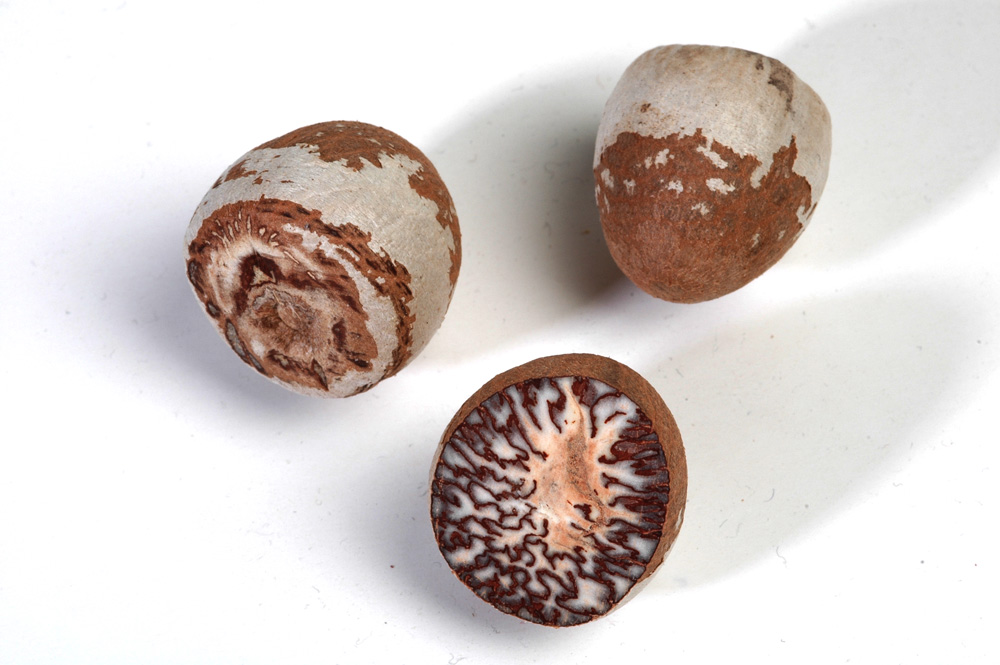
- Areca nut

Conservation status
- Data Deficient (IUCN 3.1)

Scientific classification
- Kingdom: Plantae
- Clade: Tracheophytes
- Clade: Angiosperms
- Clade: Monocots
- Clade: Commelinids
- Order: Arecales
- Family: Arecaceae
- Genus: Areca
- Species: A. catechu

Binomial name
- Areca catechu Linnaeus (1753)

Synonyms
- Areca cathechu Burm.f. (1768); Areca faufel Gaertner (1788); Areca hortensis Loureiro (1790); Areca catechu var. nigra Giseke (1792); Sublimia areca Poiteau ex Martius (1838); Areca catechu var. alba Blume (1839); Areca himalayana Griff. ex Wendland (1878); Areca nigra Giseke ex Wendland (1878); Areca catechu var. batanensis Beccari (1908); Areca macrocarpa Beccari (1909); Areca catechu var. longicarpa Beccari (1911); Areca catechu f. communis Beccari (1919); Areca catechu var. portoricensis Beccari (1919); Areca catechu var. silvatica Beccari (1919)

= Areca catechu =

Species of palm

Areca catechu (Note: Common names in English include areca palm, areca nut palm, betel palm, betel nut palm, Indian nut, and Pinang palm.) is a species of palm native to the Philippines. It was later introduced to much of tropical South and Southeast Asia, South-central China and Taiwan, West Africa and Madagascar, some of the Pacific Islands, and the West Indies. It is widely cultivated for its seeds, which are used in along with betel leaves and slaked lime for chewing.

== Taxonomy ==
It is the type species and namesake of its genus Areca, derived from Neo-Latin, which came from Malayalam "aṭaykka" ("areca nut") via Portuguese. That genus itself is type to the true palm family Arecaceae, first described by Carl Linnaeus in his book Species Plantarum in 1753.

Species epithet catechu is derived from Neo-Latin originating from Dravidian roots via Malay kacu: kachu in Tamil and Malayalam is used to refer to the resin of the tree.

== Description ==
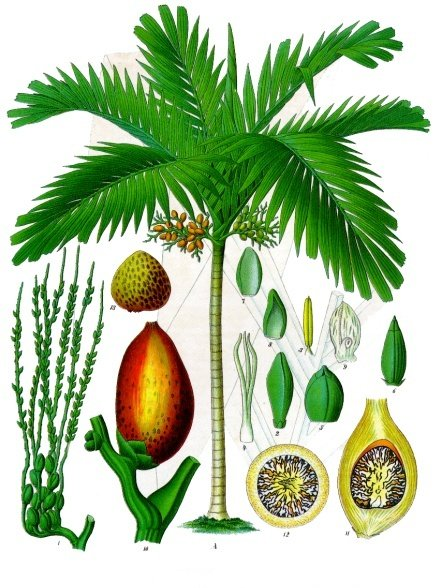
Description of Areca catechu

Areca catechu is a medium-sized palm, growing straight to about 20 m (66 ft) tall. The trunk measures 10–20 cm (3.9–7.9 in) in diameter, and is wider at the base. The mature trunk is generally greyish brown and is greener towards the top. The leaves are up to 2 m (6 ft 7 in) long with short stalks measuring 15 m (49 ft). About 8 to 10 leaves are arranged like a crown. There are about 20 to 30 dark green leaflets on either side of the central shaft that are densely and pinnately arranged. The leaflets vary in size and are longest in the middle, measuring 70 cm (28 in) in length. They are the shortest at the tip, measuring 15–25 cm (5.9–9.8 in) and the leaflets at the base of the leaf measure 40–50 cm (16–20 in) in length. The individual leaflets measure 3–7 cm (1.2–2.8 in) at its widest point near the center. The leaflets may dry at the edges and droop.

The inflorescence consists of several branches that measure up to 25 cm (9.8 in) long and extend up to 60 cm (24 in) wide. Clusters of white flowers are borne on the yellowish white rachillae distributed on a peduncle measuring up to 20 cm (7.9 in) in length. The flowers consist of three petals and very small sepals. The female flowers have larger petals measuring 1.4 cm (0.55 in) long and 0.9 cm (0.35 in) wide compared to the male flowers whose petals measure 0.5 cm (0.20 in) in length and 0.2 cm (0.079 in) in width. The male flower consists of six stamens with each stamen consisting of a short filament and ovoid anthers measuring 4 mm (0.16 in) and 0.8 mm (0.031 in) along the axes. The gynoecium consists of a white stigma with a spherical ovary measuring 8 mm (0.31 in) in diameter.

The flowers mature to produce bunches of fruits, each of which measures up to 8 cm (3.1 in) in length and 6 cm (2.4 in) in width. The fruit is green earlier while turning yellow and later to red after maturation. Each berry consists of a single seed which is rounded and tapering towards one of the ends. The reddish brown seeds are hard and measure up to 2 cm (0.79 in) in diameter.

== Distribution and habitat ==
Areca catechu is native to the Philippines. It has since been introduced South and Southeast Asia, South-central China and Taiwan, Western Africa, some of the Pacific Islands, and in the West Indies.

=== Cultivation ===
It is widely cultivated for its seed (areca nut). Though the tree grows in a variety of habitats and soils, it prefers moist, well drained soils. While it is grown in tropical areas with high annual average temperatures, they are generally planted with other trees to protect the young plants initially and the fruits from the sun later. The plants are usually sprouted directly from the seeds and are transplanted later. Other spices are often grown along with areca trees. Trees mature in about five years. The matured and ripe fruits are harvested and are dried in the sun for 40 to 45 days.

Various parts of the trees are affected by mites, nematodes and caterpillars. Plant diseases that may affect areca trees include Collar rot, Stem rot, and yellow leaf spot.

== Chemical composition and effects ==
Phenols (31.1%) including phenolic acid and flavanoids, form the main constituent of the fruit. It also contains polysaccharides (18.7%), fat (14.0%), fiber (10.8%), and alkaloids (0.5%). The fruit and seed contain flavanoids such as isorhamnetin, chrysoeriol, luteolin, quercetin, and liquiritigenin. Fatty acids found in the seeds include lauric acid, myristic acid, palmitic acid, stearic acid, oleic acid, linoleic acid, alpha-lipoic acid, and decanoic acid. Apart from these, amino acids such as phenylalanine, and arginin, and several triterpenes and steroids such as ursolic acid, sitosterol, isoarborinol, ergosterol, cylindrin, fernenol, arundoin, cycloatanol, and beta-sitostenone have been extracted from leaves and fruits.

Areca nut contains alkaloids such as arecaidine arecoline, and guvacine, and procyanidins called arecatannins. The alkaloids, specifically arecoline, has been shown to exhibit anthelmintic and antimicrobial activity against various parasites, bacteria, fungi, and certain viruses. Arecoline stimulates muscarinic receptors and influences the nervous system, thereby affecting the behaviour and psychology of human beings. It also causes relaxation of blood vessels thereby reducing the blood pressure, stimulation of smooth-muscle contraction in the gastrointestinal tract and salivation to aid digestion, and stimulation endocrine activity. The polyphenols and flavonoids in areca nut have certain anti-inflammatory and antioxidant effects. While studies have shown that arecoline exhibits effects which inhibit certain type of cancers, it is widely considered as an addictive substance and a carcinogen, having direct link to oral cancer.

== Uses ==
=== Betel nut chewing ===
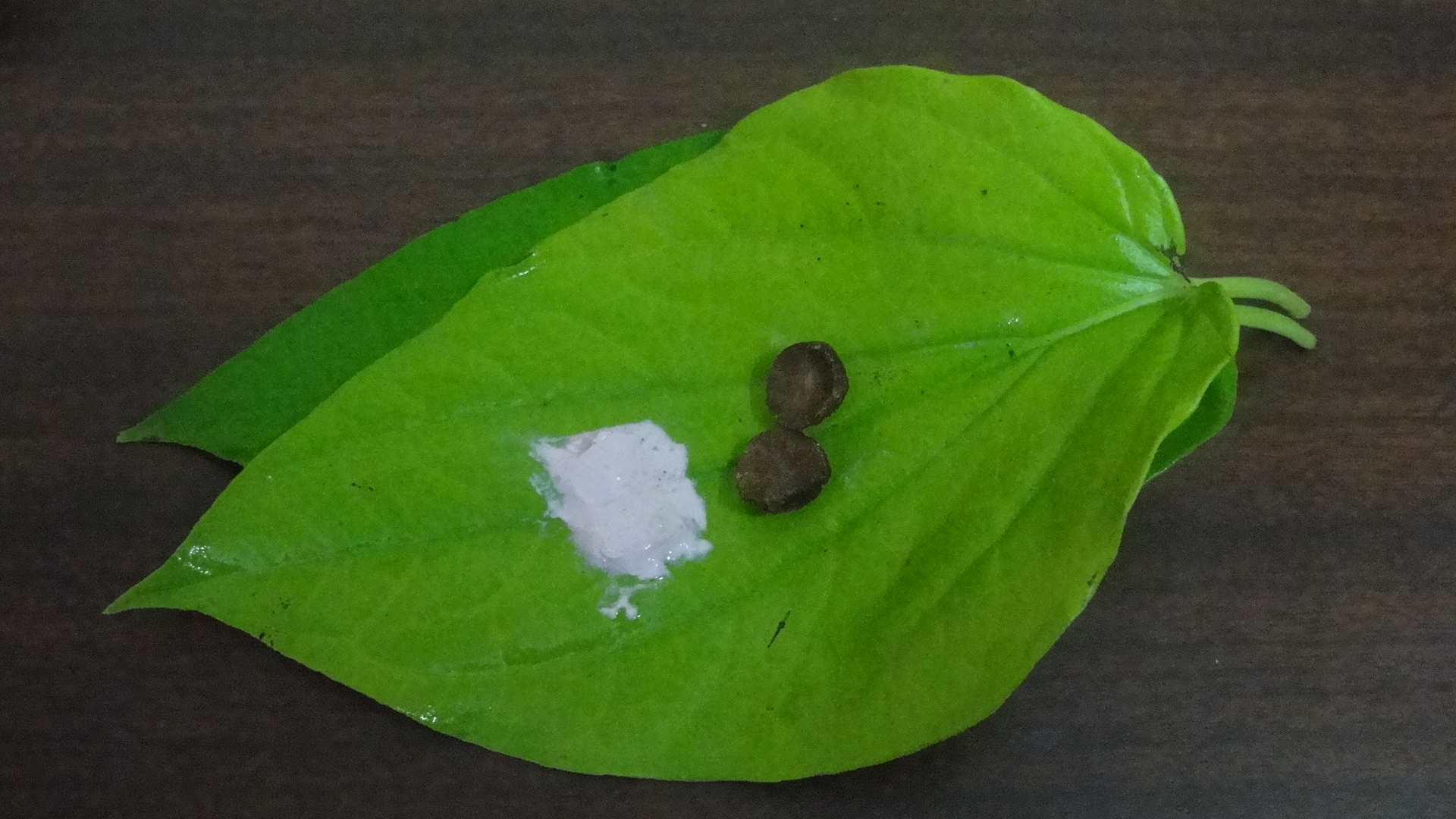
Areca nut is chewed along with slaked lime and betel leaf

Areca nut is used along with slaked lime and betel leaf, a leaf from a vine of the family Piperaceae. It is the fourth most common psychoactive substance used globally after caffeine, nicotine, and alcohol. It is widely used in traditional medicine.

The practice of chewing areca nuts originated in Maritime Southeast Asia, where the areca palm is native. The oldest known evidence of areca nut chewing was found in a burial pit in the Duyong Cave site in the Philippines, which dates to around 4,630±250 BP. Its diffusion is closely tied to the Neolithic expansion of the Austronesian peoples. It was spread to the Indo-Pacific during prehistoric times, reaching Micronesia at 3,500 to 3,000 BP, Near Oceania at 3,400 to 3,000 BP; South India and Sri Lanka by 3,500 BP; Mainland Southeast Asia by 3,000 to 2,500 BP; Northern India by 1500 BP; and Madagascar by 600 BP. From India, it was also spread westwards to Persia and the Mediterranean. It was also previously present in the Lapita culture, based on archaeological remains dated from 3,600 to 2,500 BP, but it was not carried into Polynesia.

=== Other uses ===
The areca palm is also used as an interior landscaping. Tannin obtained from the dried nuts are used as an adhesive, wall paint, food colour, and for dyeing clothes. The resin is also used for making oils used for coating wood. The edible fat obtained from the nuts is used in food products. The husk from the dried fruits are used for making cushions, ornaments, handicrafts, and fabrics. Dried leaves are pressed and moulded into disposable food wrappers, plates and bowls.

== Gallery ==
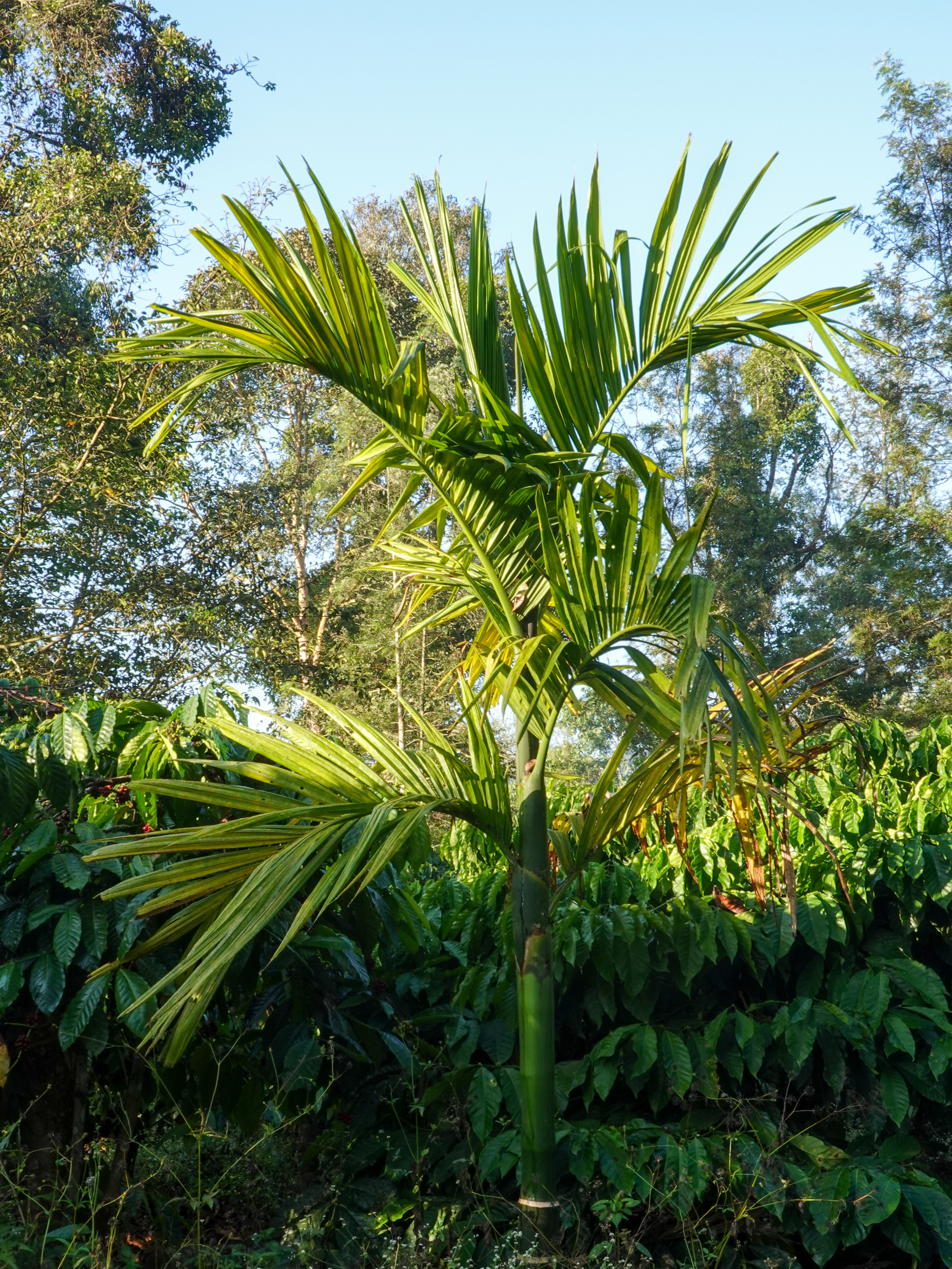
Sapling

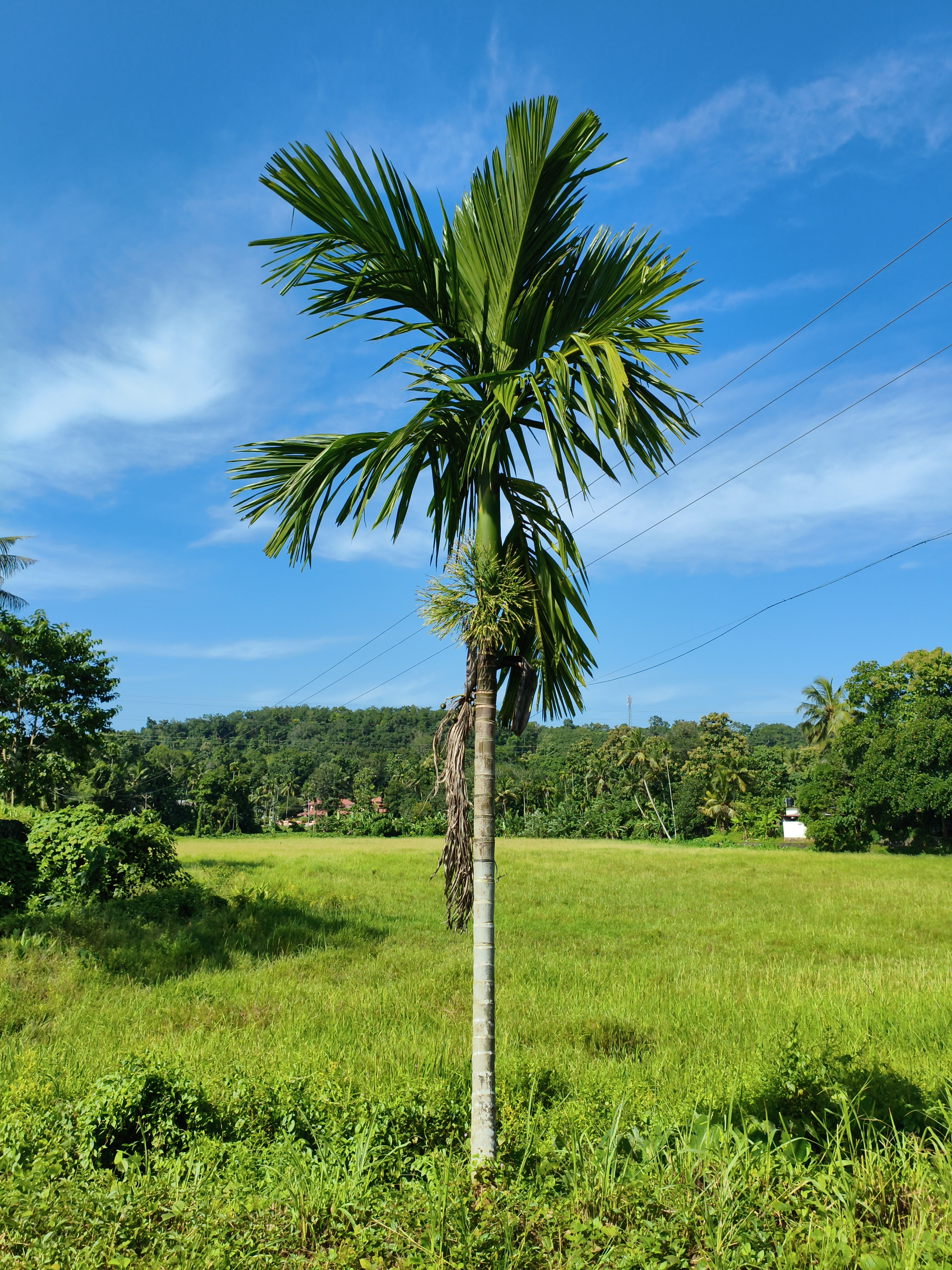
Mature tree

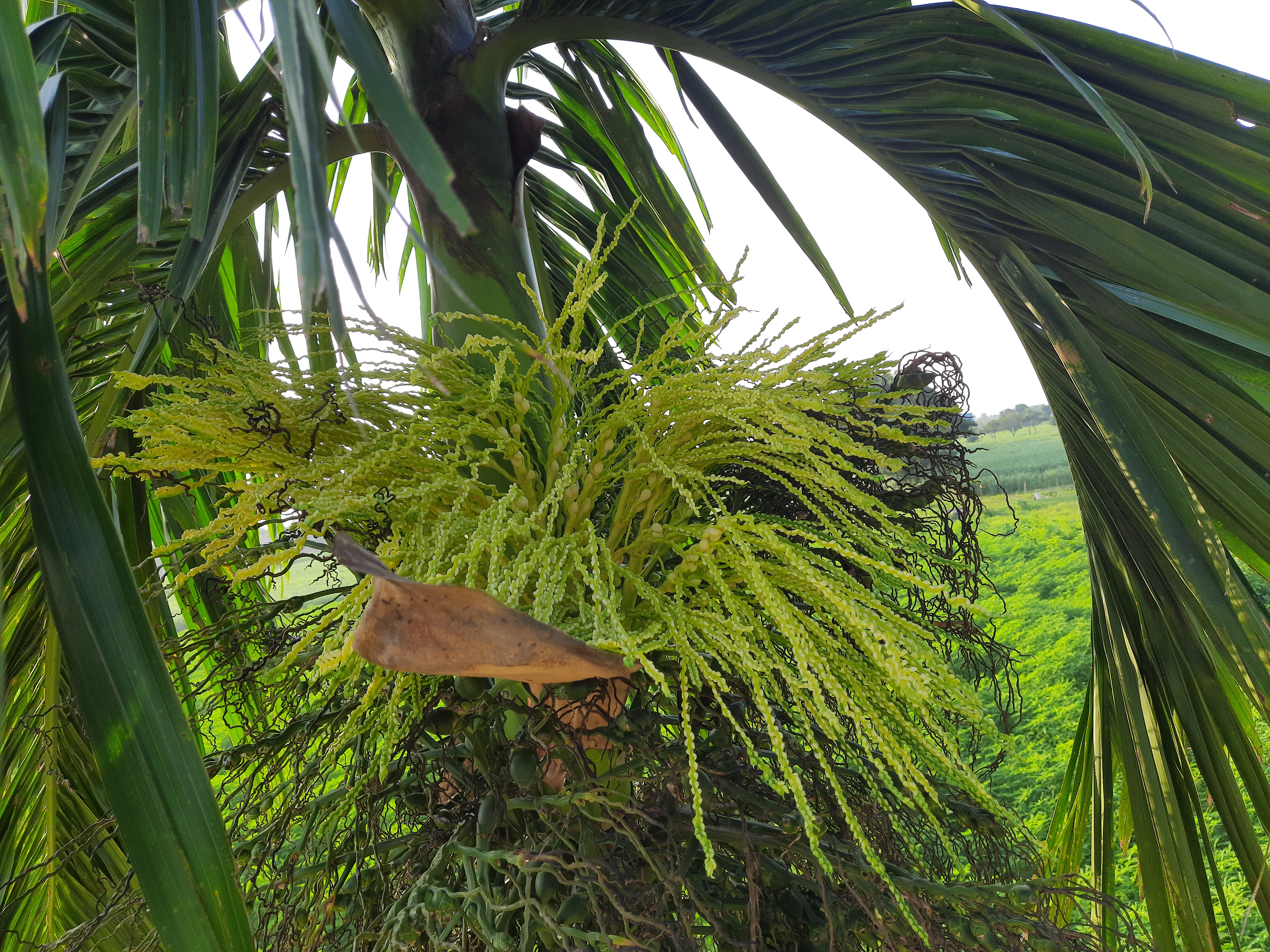
Inflorescence

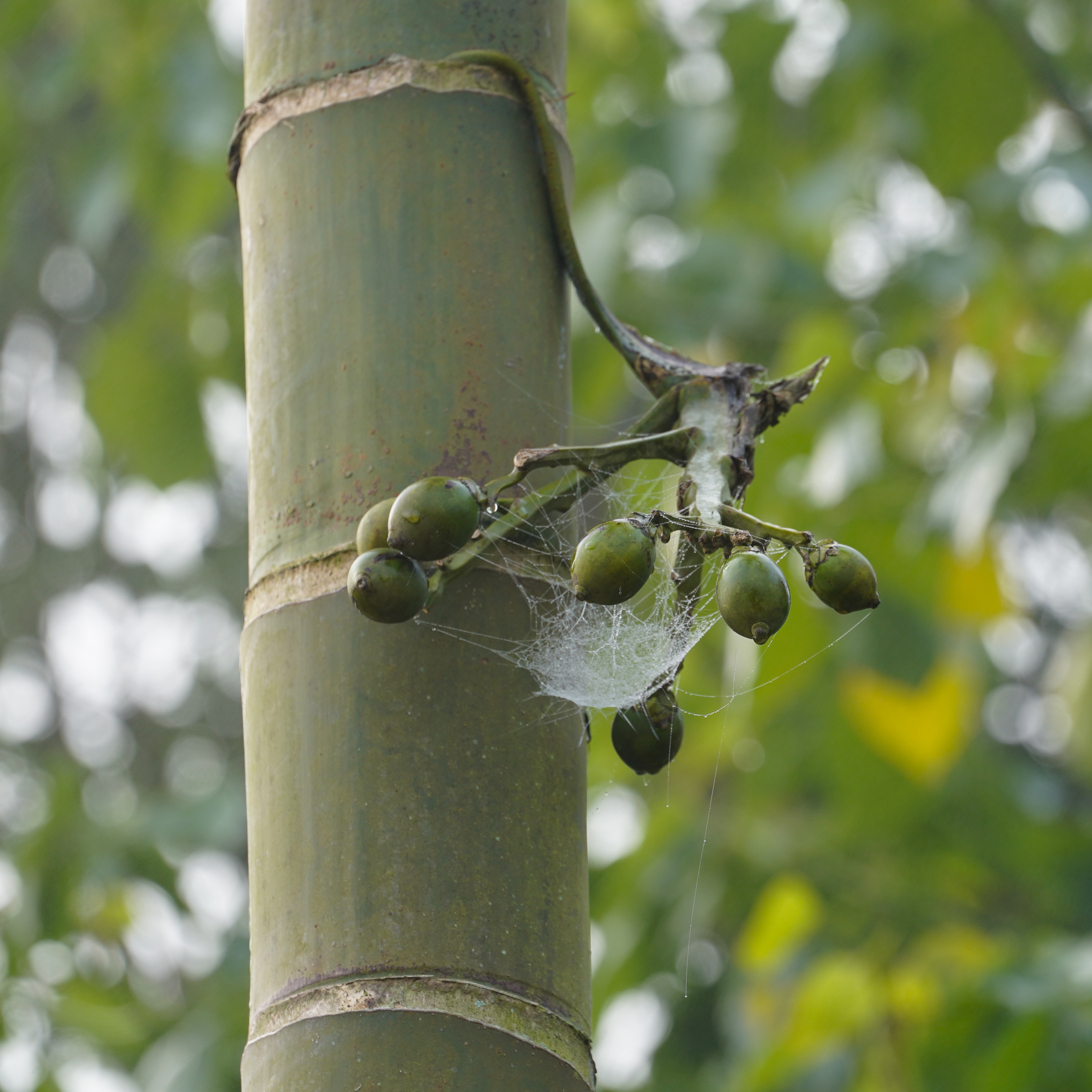
Trunk with fruits

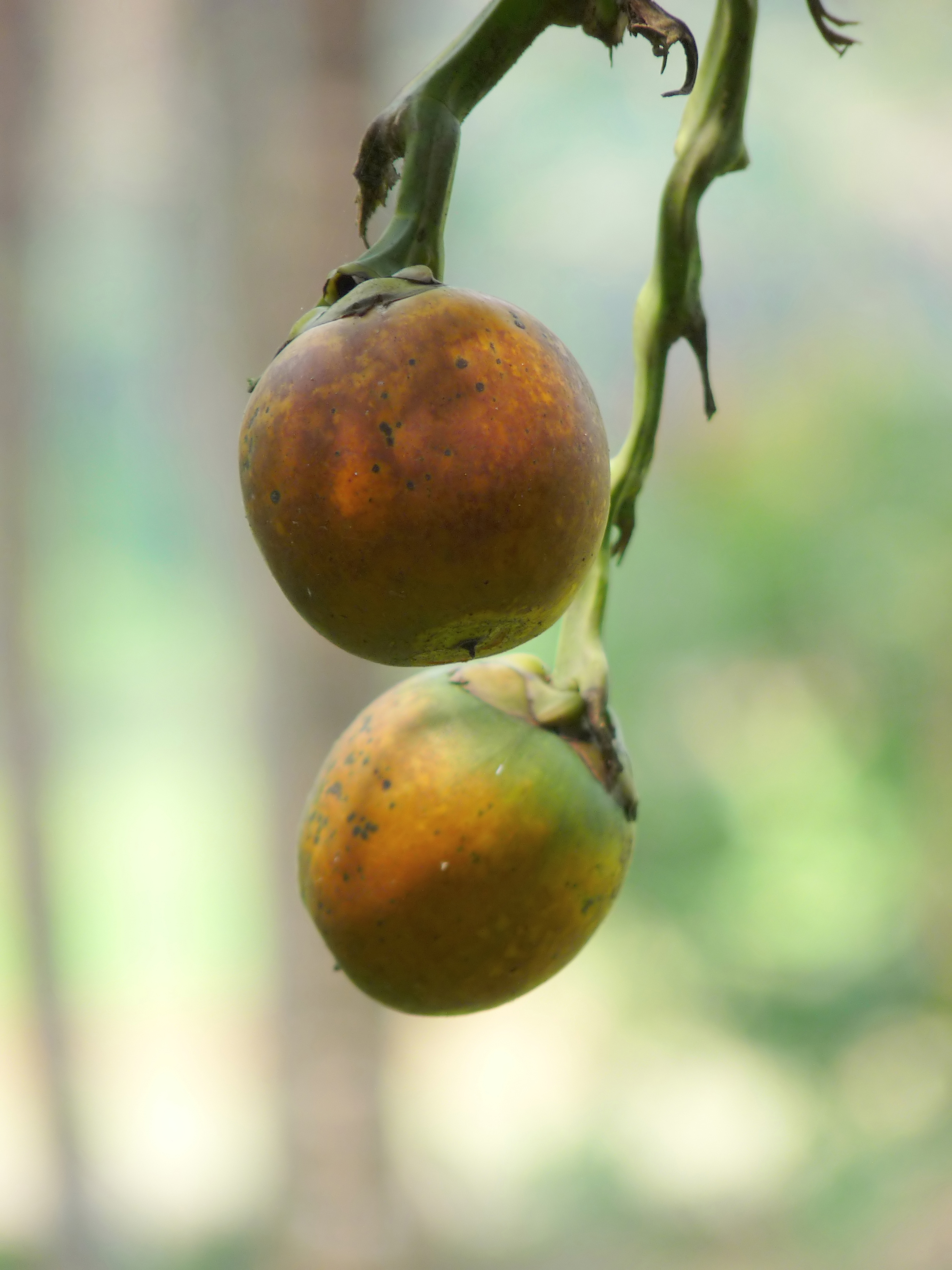
Fruit

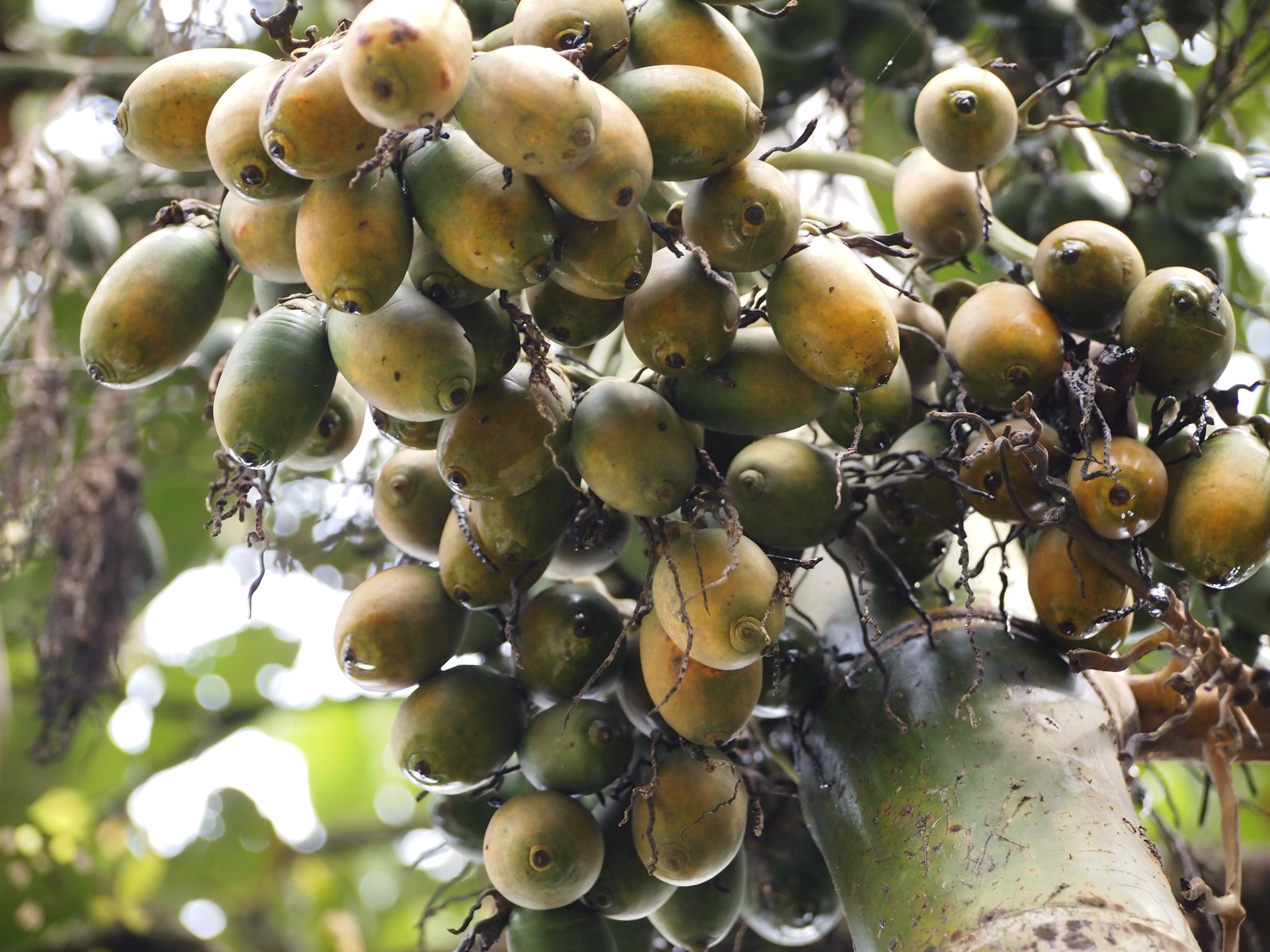
Bunch of fruits

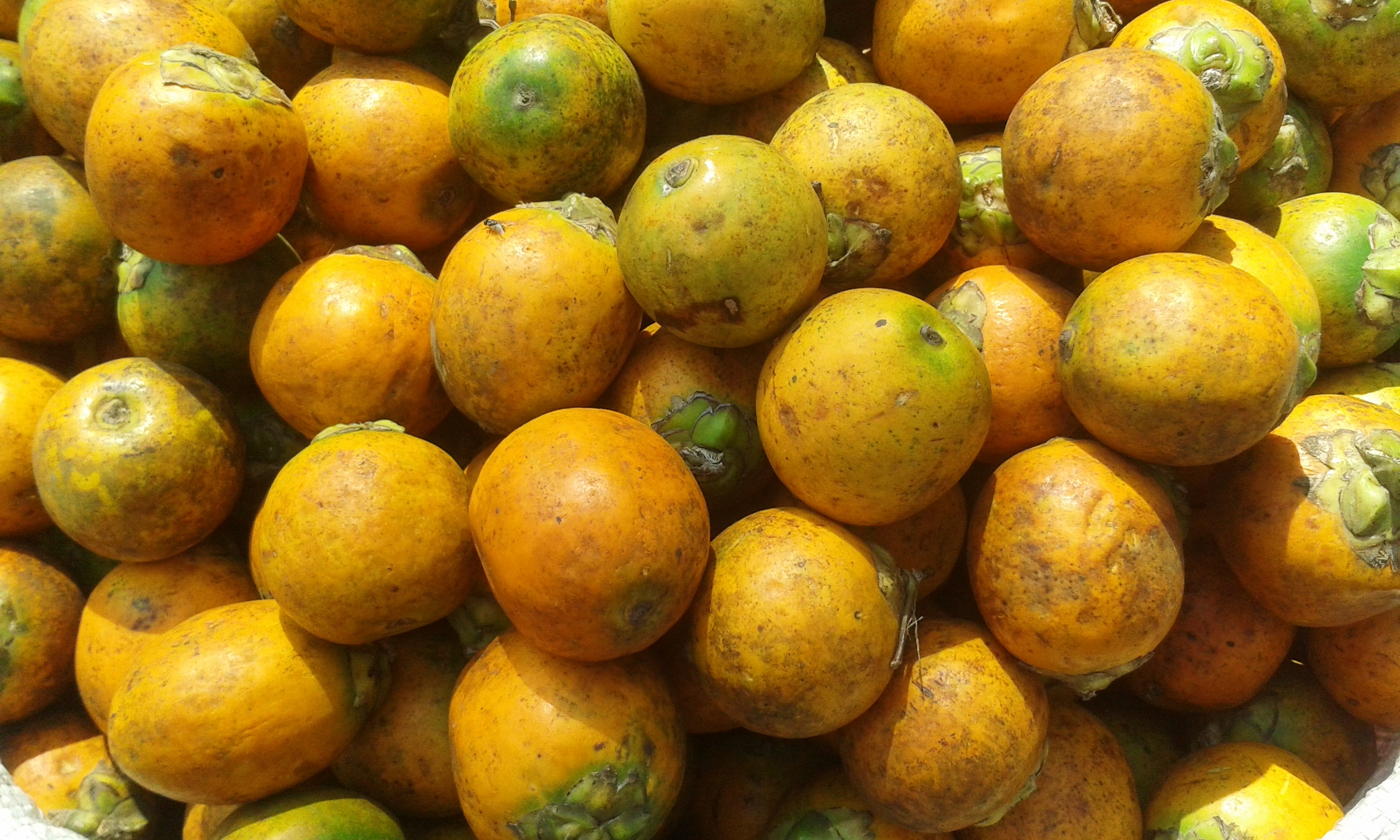
Harvested fruits

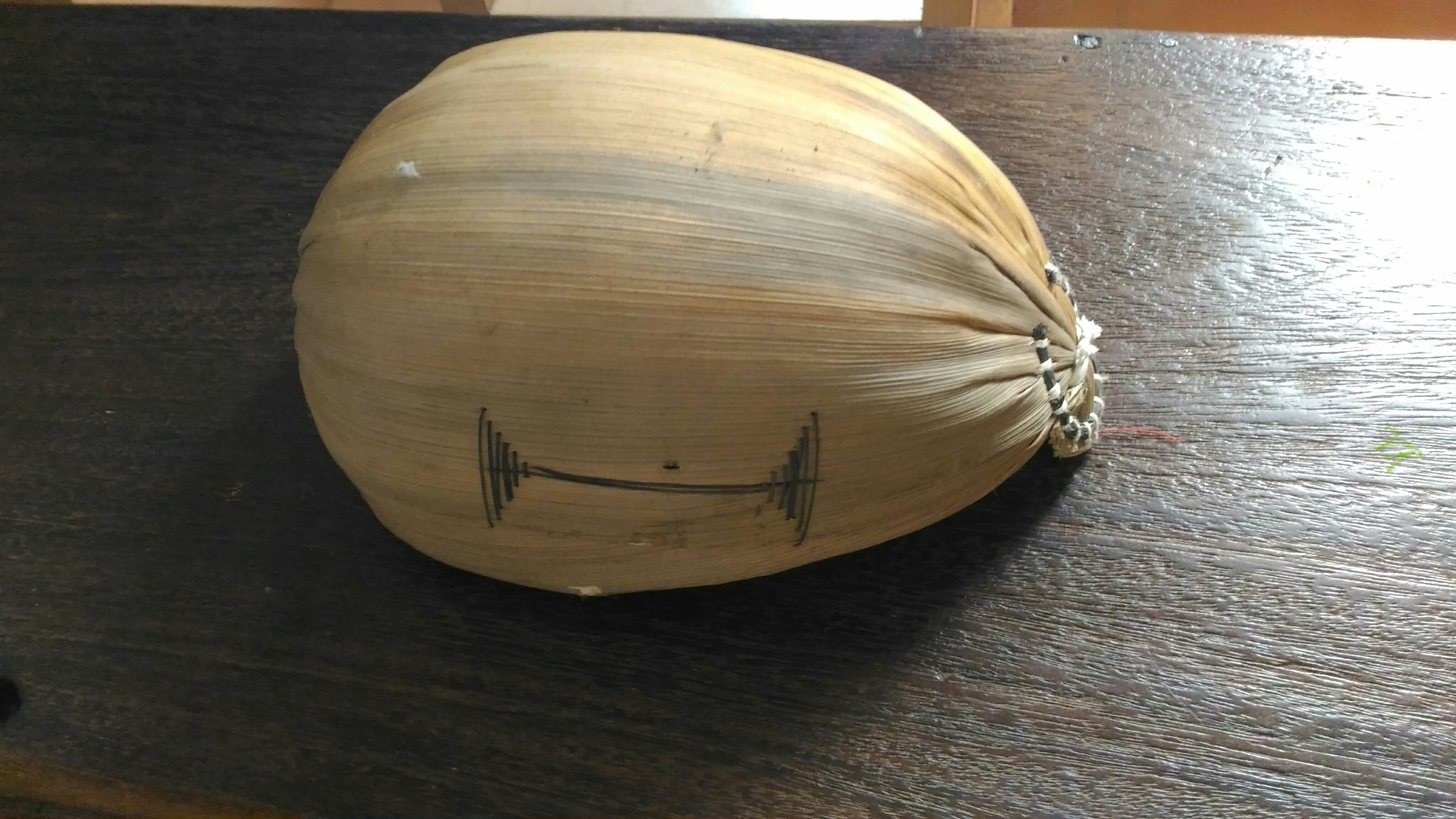
Hat made from dried leaf

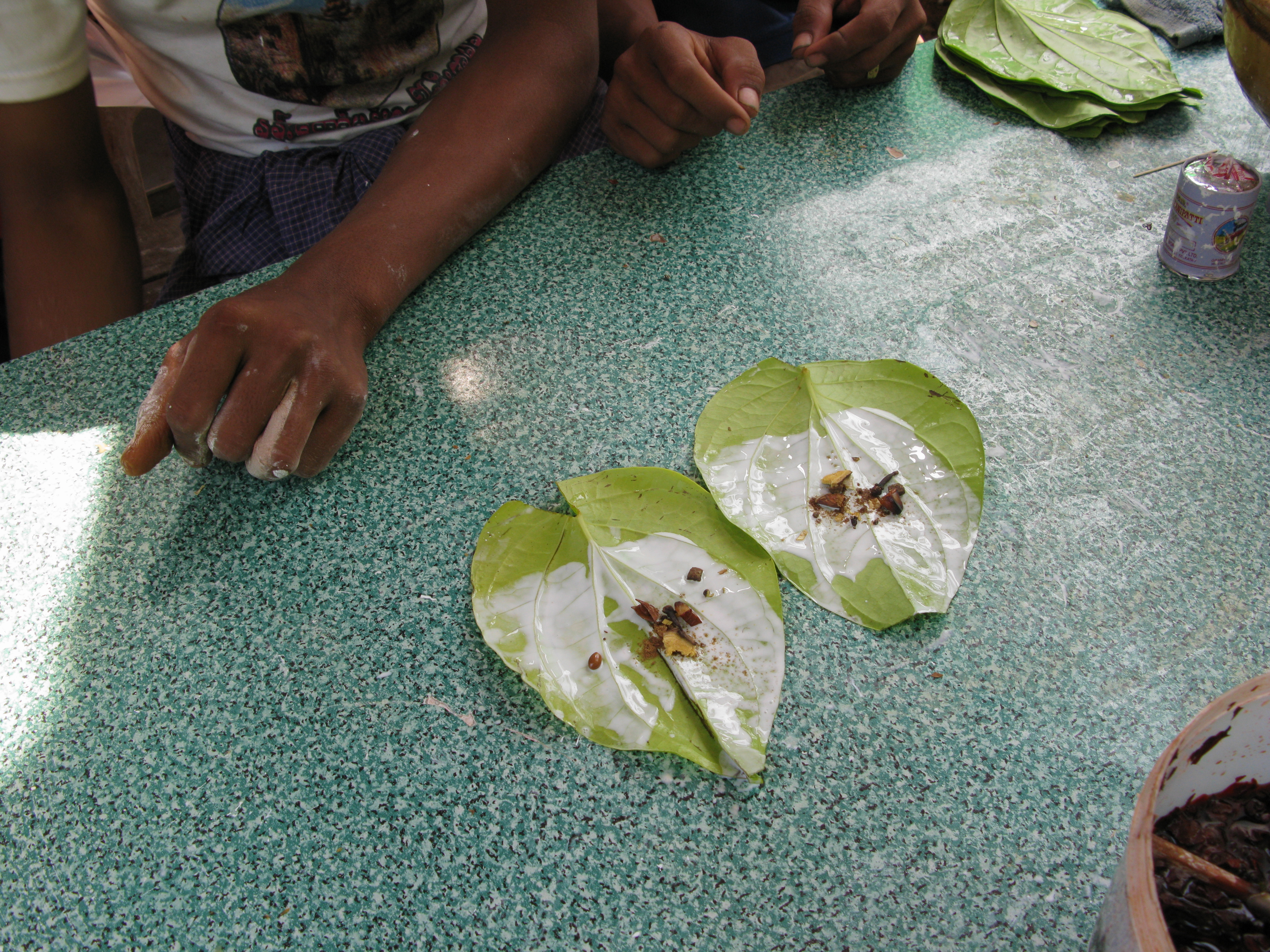
Nuts used in paan

Areca catechu on the flag of Penang

== See also ==
- Domesticated plants and animals of Austronesia
