= Dimethylglycine oxidase =

Identifiers
- EC no.: 1.5.3.10
- CAS no.: 74870-79-4

Databases
- BRENDA: enzyme data
- ExPASy: NiceZyme view
- KEGG: enzyme entry
- MetaCyc: metabolic pathway
- Rhea: reactions
- PDB structures: RCSB PDB PDBe PDBsum
- Gene Ontology: AmiGO / QuickGO
Search
- PMC: articles
- PubMed: articles
- NCBI: proteins

Dimethylglycine oxidase (EC 1.5.3.10) is an enzyme that catalyzes the chemical reaction

dimethylglycine
+ H_{2}O
O_{2}
H_{2}O_{2}
sarcosine
+ H_{2}C=O

The three substrates of this enzyme are dimethylglycine, water and oxygen. Its products are sarcosine, hydrogen peroxide, and formaldehyde. The enzyme does not further demethylate the product sarcosine to glycine. Enzymes such as sarcosine oxidase are known which can do that conversion.

This enzyme belongs to the family of oxidoreductases, specifically those acting on the CH-NH group of donors with oxygen as acceptor. The systematic name of this enzyme class is N,N-dimethylglycine:oxygen oxidoreductase (demethylating). It employs one cofactor, FAD.

== Structural studies ==
As of late 2007, 3 structures have been solved for this class of enzymes, with PDB accession codes 1PJ5, 1PJ6, and 1PJ7.
