= Demethylation inhibitor =

Substance that blocks the removal of methyl groups

A demethylation inhibitor is a compound that blocks the removal of methyl groups. It blocks enzymes (demethylases) from removing methyl groups. Demethylation inhibitors are a subgroup of sterol biosynthesis inhibitors (steroidogenesis inhibitors). They are used as antifungals and antiprotozoals agents. Demethylation inhibitors may commonly refer to fungicides that stop fungal growth by inhibiting sterol (ergosterol) production, vital for fungal cell membranes. Examples are triazoles, imidazoles, difenoconazole, enilconazole, fenbuconazole, fenarimol, flutriafol, ipconazole, metconazole, myclobutanil, propiconazole, prothioconazole, tebuconazole, triadimenol and triadimefon.

Ergosterol is absent in animal cells but is an essential component of the cell membranes of many fungi and protozoa.

DNA demethylating agents are used in cancer therapy like 5-azacytidine to reactivate silenced genes by preventing DNA methylation.

== See also ==
- DNA methylation
- DNA demethylation
- Demethylating agent
