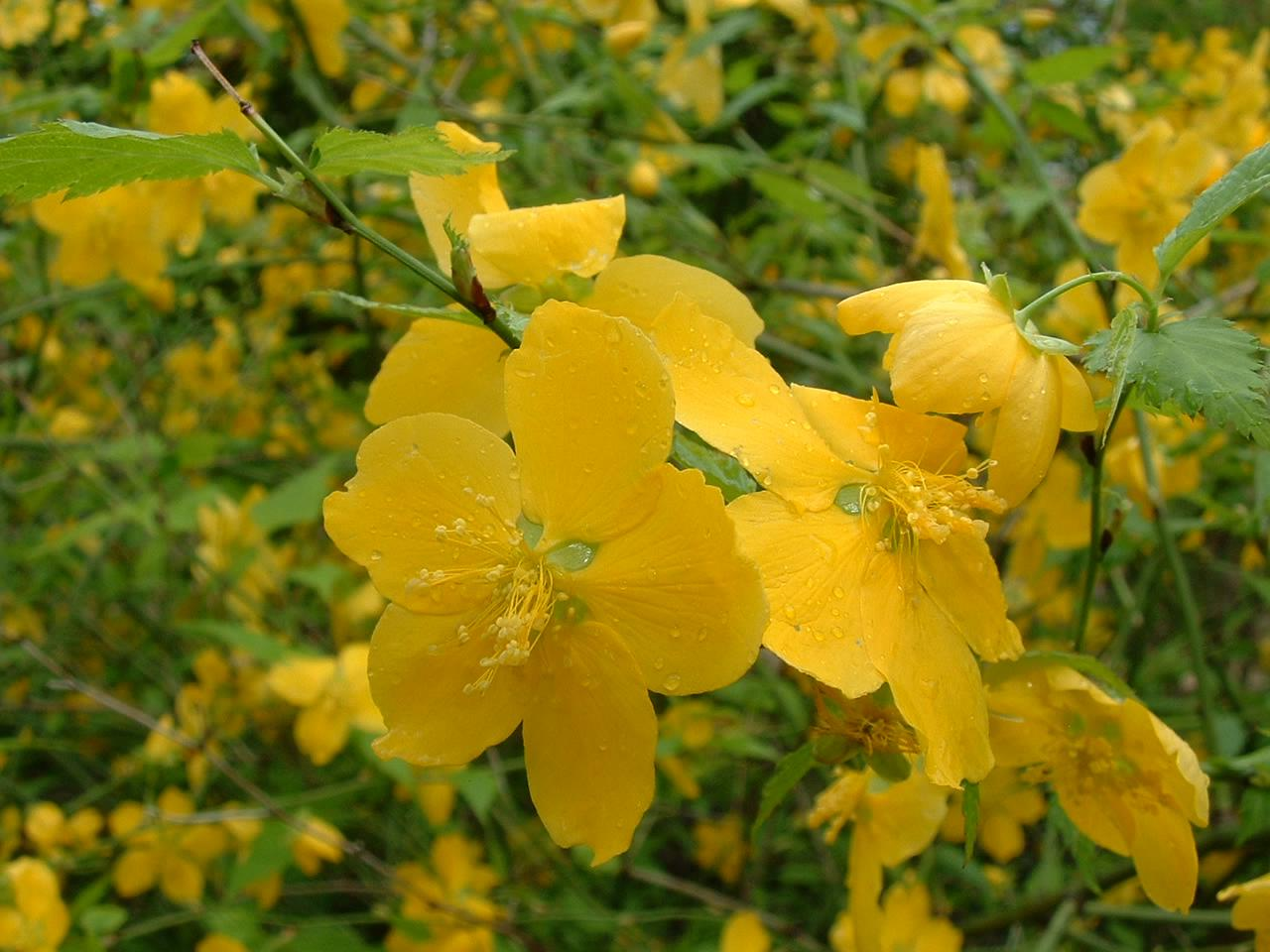
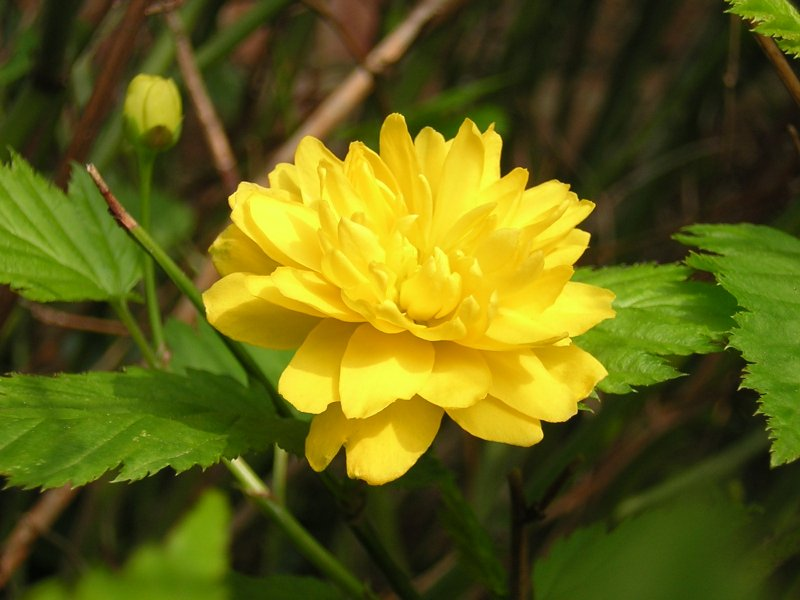
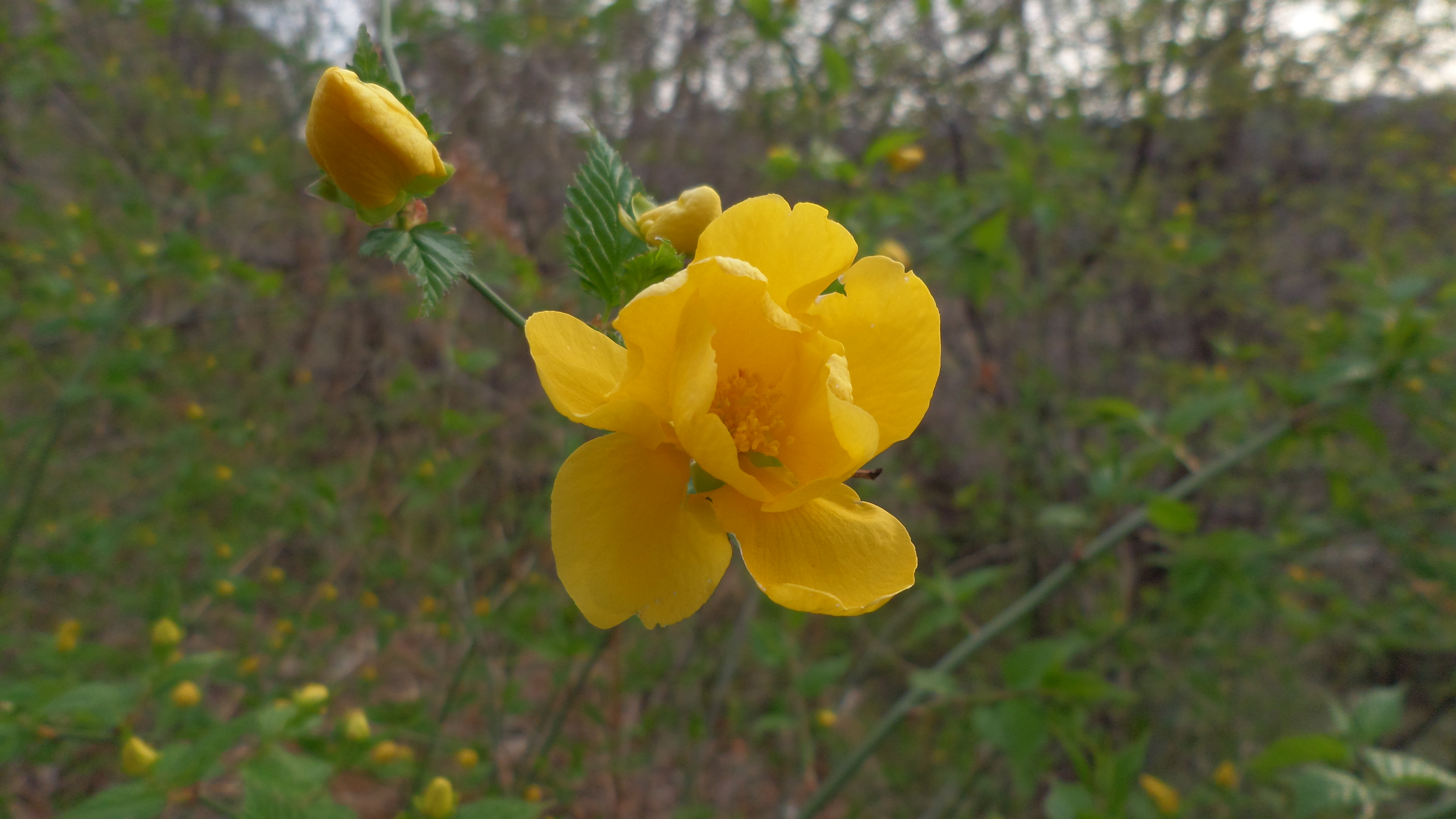
- Natural form Cultivar 'Pleniflora' Wild semi-double form in Fukushima

Scientific classification
- Kingdom: Plantae
- Clade: Tracheophytes
- Clade: Angiosperms
- Clade: Eudicots
- Clade: Rosids
- Order: Rosales
- Family: Rosaceae
- Subfamily: Amygdaloideae
- Tribe: Kerrieae
- Genus: Kerria; DC.
- Species: K. japonica

Binomial name
- Kerria japonica (L.) DC.

= Kerria japonica =

Species of shrub

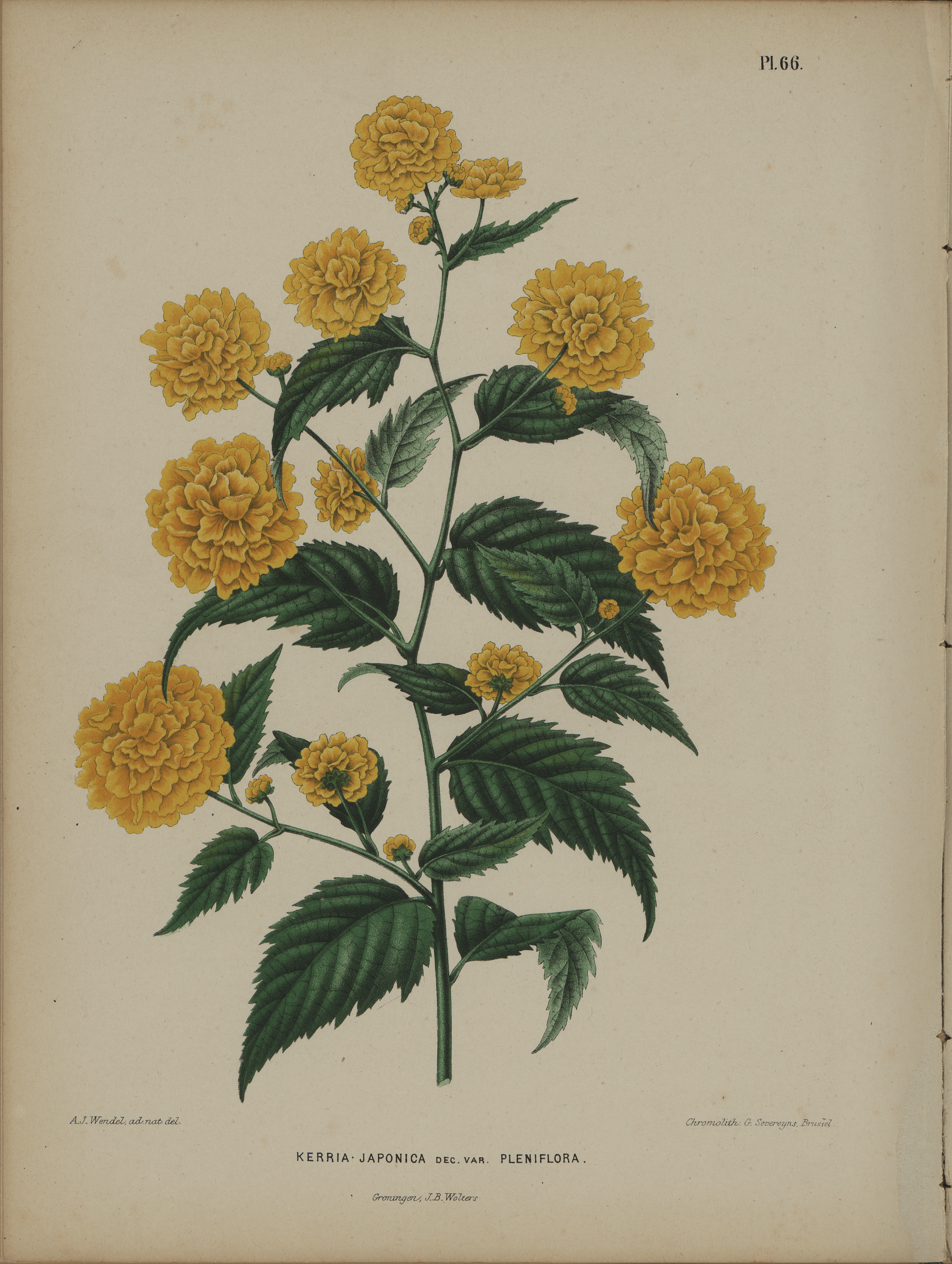
Kerria japonica by Abraham Jacobus Wendel, 1868

Kerria japonica, commonly known as Japanese kerria or Japanese rose, is a deciduous, yellow-flowering shrub in the rose family (Rosaceae), native to China and Japan. It is the only species in the genus Kerria. In the wild, it grows in thickets on mountain slopes. Japanese kerria has been used for medicine and is also planted in gardens. A double-flowered cultivar, K. japonica 'Pleniflora', is commonly called bachelor's buttons. When cultivated in the Central-Southern U.S., the plant is usually called Yellow Rose of Texas. Although the genus Kerria is in the rose family, it is not a true rose.

== Name ==
The genus name Kerria is also a common name for the species (Kerria). It is named after Scottish gardener William Kerr, who introduced the Japanese kerria cultivar 'Pleniflora'.

In addition to the common names mentioned above, it is also known as Japanese marigold bush or miracle marigold bush in northern New England, although K. japonica is not closely related to the true marigolds (Calendula spp.), which are asterids.

It is sometimes known by its Japanese name yamabuki (山吹/ヤマブキ) lit. "mountain butterbur" or "mountain breeze"); its Chinese name is dìtáng (huā) (棣棠[花]).

== Description ==
Kerria japonica grows to 1–3 m (3–10 ft) tall, with weak arching stems often scrambling over other vegetation or rocks. In the wild it grows in thickets on mountain slopes. The leaves are alternate, simple, 3–10 cm (1–4 in) long, with a doubly serrated margin. The flowers are golden yellow, with five petals, and evenly-spaced along branches of new green growth. The fruit is a dry single-seeded achene 4–4.5 mm (0.16–0.18 in) long.

== Cultivation ==
Kerria is valued in gardens for its golden yellow flowers, which appear in the spring. It is best grown with some shade from full sunlight to avoid blanching the flowers, and needs to be pruned after flowering to maintain health and vigour. Two cultivars have gained the Royal Horticultural Society's Award of Garden Merit, K. japonica 'Golden guinea' and the double-flowered K. japonica 'Pleniflora', commonly known as bachelor's buttons.

== Pests and diseases ==
Since 2014 the UK's Royal Horticultural Society has been receiving reports from gardeners and horticulturalists of damage to plants of the shrub Kerria japonica. Symptoms include multiple red spots on leaves, and lesions on the stems, resulting in defoliation and eventual death. It has been determined that this infection is caused by the fungus Blumeriella kerriae, which is specific to the kerria. This highly contagious disease, known in English as kerria twig and leaf blight, was known in the U.S. but has not previously been observed on British plants. It is regarded as a serious threat to the cultivated kerria plants, which are popular garden shrubs.

== Medicinal use ==
The plant has anti-inflammatory properties and a decoction of the flowering shoots with honey has been used in China in the treatment of coughs and gynecological disorders.

== Chemistry ==
The leaves and roots contain 0.002% hydrogen cyanide, while the tender shoots are a rich source of vitamin C (200 mg per 100 g) and the seeds contain 44.9% protein and 45.3% fat. The flower petals contain the O-methylated flavonoid pectolinarin, (5,7-dihydroxy-4,6-dimethoxyflavone-7-rutinoside), a cytotoxic compound known also as Neolinarin and found also in Linaria species, Kickxia elatine and the Duranta species D. plumieri.

== In culture ==
#FFA400

#FFBF00

#F8B500

Kerria japonica is mentioned frequently in the Man'yōshū, the oldest extant collection of Japanese poetry from the AD first millennium. In addition, the Japanese call the golden yellow color (variously #FFA400, #FFBF00, #F8B500) between orange and yellow yamabuki color (山吹色 yamabuki-iro), from the name of the plant.

Qing Dynasty poet Chen Hao (陳淏) celebrated the beauty of Kerria japonica in his agricultural treatise the Flower Mirror (花鏡).
