= Blumeriella kerriae =

Scientific classification
- Kingdom: Fungi
- Division: Ascomycota
- Class: Leotiomycetes
- Order: Helotiales
- Family: Drepanopezizaceae
- Genus: Blumeriella
- Species: B. kerriae

Binomial name
- Blumeriella kerriae (V.B.Stewart) Korf 1971

Synonyms
- Coccomyces kerriae V.B. Stewart 1917 (basionym); Cylindrosporium kerriae V.B. Stewart 1917; Higginsia kerriae (V.B. Stewart) Nannf. 1932

Species of fungus

Blumeriella kerriae is a species of fungus in the family Drepanopezizaceae.

== Taxonomy ==
Blumeriella kerriae was described by Vern Bonham Stewart in 1917 as Cylindrosporium kerriae, with the basionym Coccomyces kerriae. The species was transferred to the genus Higginsia by John-Axel Nannfeldt in 1932. Finally, the species was transferred to the genus Blumeriella by Richard Paul “Dick” Korf in 1971.

== Plant pathogen ==
Blumeriella kerriae is a plant pathogen specific to plants of the genus Kerria. It causes Kerria twig and leaf blight, a highly contagious disease native to the United States but until 2014 unknown to Great Britain. Symptoms include multiple red spots on leaves and lesions on the stems, resulting in defoliation and eventual death. Since 2014, the Royal Horticultural Society in the UK has received reports from gardeners and horticulturalists of damage to plants of the shrub Kerria japonica by B. kerriae. It is regarded as a serious threat to the cultivated Kerria plants, which are popular garden shrubs.

== Description ==
The structures of this fungal pathogen appear on both sides of the leaves of the plant as small red-brown spots, typically measuring 1-5mm in diameter, with dark purple borders. On the stem, the lesions caused by the pathogen are slightly sunken and purple-brown in color. If the pathogen is allowed to spread, the lesions will eventually take over and the plant will turn brown and then die. A key diagnostic feature of Blumeriella kerriae is the presence of acervuli containing conidiophores and conidia within the lesions and leaf spots. The spores may be visible as white clusters in the center of the spots, particularly in wet conditions. The conidia are filiform, curved, hyaline, and 1–3 septate. The morphology of Blumeriella kerriae is an important factor in identifying and managing the disease, as it helps distinguish it from other plant pathogens that may cause similar symptoms.

== Lifecycle ==
The lesions mature and develop acervuli containing conidia, which can spread via rain splash, wind, and transfer on contaminated tools. Production of these asexual spores occurs year-round. The fungus overwinters on fallen leaves and lesions on the stems, and during this time sexual spores have been observed to be produced.

== Habitat and distribution ==
Blumeriella kerriae is limited to the leaves and stems of plants in the Kerria genus, which includes early flowering, deciduous shrubs that are common in gardens. The most popular of these shrubs is Kerria japonica, commonly known as Japanese Kerria. These shrubs grow in full to part-shade landscapes and are cold hardy. They grow best in USDA zones 4 through 9, UK zone 4, and central and southern China to southern Korea and Japan. The fungus thrives in moist conditions, and can quickly become difficult to control. Due to these factors, the popularity of Kerria shrubs has dropped significantly in areas where Blumeriella kerriae has been identified.

== Control ==
Practicing good garden hygiene is the first and best line of control for protecting plants from pathogens. However, once Blumeriella kerriae is introduced into an area, it is difficult to avoid and to eradicate. The removal of all infected plant material and burning it is the best way to manage it effectively. Clearing fallen leaves is also essential to reduce the chance of inoculum in the following year. No fungicides that specifically target Blumeriella kerriae are available yet, but tebuconazole with trifloxystrobin is generally recommended for controlling leaf spots on ornamental plants. Spraying chlorothalonil has been observed to reduce the spread of the disease. Repeated sprays will likely be required to control the disease.
