= Arecatannin B1 =

- Chemical structure of arecatannin B1

Names
- IUPAC name [(2R,3R,4R)-Flavan-3,3′,4′,5,7-pentol]-(4→8)-[(2R,3R,4S)-flavan-3,3′,4′,5,7-pentol]-(4→6)-[(2R,3S)-flavan-3,3′,4′,5,7-pentol]
- Systematic IUPAC name (1^{2}R,1^{3}R,1^{4}R,2^{2}R,2^{3}R,2^{4}S,3^{2}R,3^{3}S)-1^{2},2^{2},3^{2}-Tris(3,4-dihydroxyphenyl)-1^{3},1^{4},2^{3},2^{4},3^{3},3^{4}-hexahydro-1^{2}H,2^{2}H,3^{2}H-[1^{4},2^{8}:2^{4},3^{6}-ter-1-benzopyran]-1^{3},1^{5},1^{7},2^{3},2^{5},2^{7},3^{3},3^{5},3^{7}-nonol
- Other names Epicatechin-(4β→8)-epicatechin-(4β→6)-catechin

Identifiers
| CAS Number | 79763-28-3 |
| 3D model (JSmol) | Interactive image |
| ChEBI | CHEBI:75642 |
| ChemSpider | 10290128 |
| KEGG | C17892 |
| PubChem CID | 14237657 |
| UNII | 3S8S4BYC2M |
| CompTox Dashboard (EPA) | DTXSID40557801 |
- InChI: InChI=1S/C45H38O18/c46-18-10-26(53)33-32(11-18)62-43(16-2-5-21(48)24(51)8-16)40(59)37(33)35-27(54)13-28(55)36-38(41(60)44(63-45(35)36)17-3-6-22(49)25(52)9-17)34-29(56)14-31-19(39(34)58)12-30(57)42(61-31)15-1-4-20(47)23(50)7-15/h1-11,13-14,30,37-38,40-44,46-60H,12H2/t30-,37+,38-,40+,41+,42+,43+,44+/m0/s1 Key: PBYRKMXDROOXMU-XKDUFCMJSA-N; InChI=1/C45H38O18/c46-18-10-26(53)33-32(11-18)62-43(16-2-5-21(48)24(51)8-16)40(59)37(33)35-27(54)13-28(55)36-38(41(60)44(63-45(35)36)17-3-6-22(49)25(52)9-17)34-29(56)14-31-19(39(34)58)12-30(57)42(61-31)15-1-4-20(47)23(50)7-15/h1-11,13-14,30,37-38,40-44,46-60H,12H2/t30-,37+,38-,40+,41+,42+,43+,44+/m0/s1 Key: PBYRKMXDROOXMU-XKDUFCMJBX
- SMILES: Oc1ccc(cc1O)[C@H]9Oc2cc(O)cc(O)c2[C@H](c8c(O)cc(O)c3c8O[C@@H]([C@H](O)[C@H]3c6c(O)cc5O[C@H](c4ccc(O)c(O)c4)[C@@H](O)Cc5c6O)c7ccc(O)c(O)c7)[C@H]9O

Properties
| Chemical formula | C_{45}H_{38}O_{18} |
| Molar mass | 866.77 g/mol |
- Except where otherwise noted, data are given for materials in their standard state (at 25 °C [77 °F], 100 kPa). verify (what is ?) Infobox references

Arecatannin B1 is a B type proanthocyanidin found in the betel nut. It is an arecatannin trimer with a 4β→6 bond.
