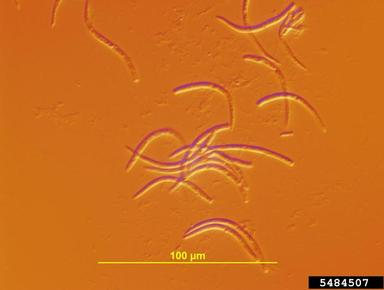
- conidia of cherry leaf spot

Scientific classification
- Kingdom: Fungi
- Division: Ascomycota
- Class: Leotiomycetes
- Order: Helotiales
- Family: Drepanopezizaceae
- Genus: Blumeriella; Arx

Type species
- Blumeriella jaapii (Rehm) Arx

Species
- Blumeriella ceanothi; Blumeriella filipendulae; Blumeriella haddenii; Blumeriella jaapii; Blumeriella kerriae

= Blumeriella =

Genus of fungi in the family Dermateaceae

Blumeriella is a genus of fungi in the family Drepanopezizaceae, formerly placed in Dermateaceae. The genus contain five species.

== Species ==
As of 2023, five species are described in the genus Blumeriella.

- Blumeriella ceanothi (Ellis & Everh.) Rossman (2014)
- Blumeriella filipendulae (Thüm.) Rossman (2014)
- Blumeriella haddenii M.A. Will. & E.C. Bernard (1988)
- Blumeriella jaapii (Rehm) Arx (1961)
- Blumeriella kerriae (V.B. Stewart) Korf (1971)

Synonyms

- Blumeriella hiemalis and Blumeriella prunophorae are synonyms of B. jaapii.
