= Arecatannin =

Group of chemical compounds

Arecatannin A1
- Chemical structure of arecatannin A1.

Names
- IUPAC name (2R,3R,4S)-2-(3,4-dihydroxyphenyl)-4-[(2R,3S)-2-(3,4-dihydroxyphenyl)-3,5,7-trihydroxy-3,4-dihydro-2H-chromen-8-yl]-8-[(2R,3R,4R)-2-(3,4-dihydroxyphenyl)-3,5,7-trihydroxy-3,4-dihydro-2H-chromen-4-yl]-3,4-dihydro-2H-chromene-3,5,7-triol
- Other names: Procyanidin T2; (-)-Epicatechin-(4β→8)-(-)-epicatechin-(4β→8)-(+)-catechin

Identifiers
CAS Number	79813-67-5
3D model (JSmol)	Interactive image
ChEMBL	ChEMBL4476324
ChemSpider	10290129
KEGG	C17894
PubChem CID	13752000
- InChI: InChI=1S/C45H38O18/c46-18-10-27(54)33-32(11-18)61-42(16-2-5-21(48)25(52)8-16)39(59)37(33)35-29(56)14-30(57)36-38(40(60)43(63-45(35)36)17-3-6-22(49)26(53)9-17)34-28(55)13-23(50)19-12-31(58)41(62-44(19)34)15-1-4-20(47)24(51)7-15/h1-11,13-14,31,37-43,46-60H,12H2/t31-,37+,38-,39+,40+,41+,42+,43+/m0/s1 Key: MOJZMWJRUKIQGL-POEQRLLMSA-N
- SMILES: OC1=C2C(=C(C(O)=C1)[C@H]3C=4C(O[C@@H]([C@@H]3O)C5=CC(O)=C(O)C=C5)=CC(O)=CC4O)O[C@@H]([C@H](O)[C@H]2C6=C7C(C[C@H](O)[C@H](O7)C8=CC(O)=C(O)C=C8)=C(O)C=C6O)C9=CC(O)=C(O)C=C9

Properties
Chemical formula	C_{45}H_{38}O_{18}
Molar mass	866.77 g/mol
- Except where otherwise noted, data are given for materials in their standard state (at 25 °C [77 °F], 100 kPa). Infobox references

Arecatannin A2
- Chemical structure of arecatannin A2.

Names
- IUPAC name (2R,3R,4R)-2-(3,4-dihydroxyphenyl)-4-[(2R,3R,4S)-2-(3,4-dihydroxyphenyl)-4-[(2R,3S)-2-(3,4-dihydroxyphenyl)-3,5,7-trihydroxy-3,4-dihydro-2H-chromen-8-yl]-3,5,7-trihydroxy-3,4-dihydro-2H-chromen-8-yl]-8-[(2R,3R,4R)-2-(3,4-dihydroxyphenyl)-3,5,7-trihydroxy-3,4-dihydro-2H-chromen-4-yl]-3,4-dihydro-2H-chromene-3,5,7-triol
- Other names: (-)-Epicatechin-(4β→8)-(-)-epicatechin-(4β→8)-(-)epicatechin-(4β→8)-(+)-catechin

Identifiers
CAS Number	79763-29-4
3D model (JSmol)	Interactive image
ChEBI	CHEBI:192503
ChemSpider	10290134
KEGG	C17893
PubChem CID	16142155
- InChI: InChI=1S/C60H50O24/c61-23-13-34(71)42-41(14-23)81-55(20-2-6-26(63)31(68)10-20)51(78)48(42)44-36(73)17-38(75)46-50(53(80)57(83-59(44)46)22-4-8-28(65)33(70)12-22)47-39(76)18-37(74)45-49(52(79)56(84-60(45)47)21-3-7-27(64)32(69)11-21)43-35(72)16-29(66)24-15-40(77)54(82-58(24)43)19-1-5-25(62)30(67)9-19/h1-14,16-18,40,48-57,61-80H,15H2/t40-,48+,49-,50+,51+,52+,53+,54+,55+,56+,57+/m0/s1 Key: QFLMUASKTWGRQE-MPCJJEQZSA-N
- SMILES: O[C@@H]1[C@H](C=2C(=C(C(O)=CC2O)[C@H]3C=4C(O[C@@H]([C@@H]3O)C5=CC(O)=C(O)C=C5)=CC(O)=CC4O)O[C@@H]1C6=CC(O)=C(O)C=C6)C7=C8C([C@@H]([C@@H](O)[C@H](O8)C9=CC(O)=C(O)C=C9)C%10=C%11C(C[C@H](O)[C@H](O%11)C%12=CC(O)=C(O)C=C%12)=C(O)C=C%10O)=C(O)C=C7O

Properties
Chemical formula	C_{60}H_{50}O_{24}
Molar mass	1155.03 g/mol
- Except where otherwise noted, data are given for materials in their standard state (at 25 °C [77 °F], 100 kPa). Infobox references

Arecatannin A3
- Chemical structure of arecatannin A3.

Names
- Other names: (2R,2′R,2′′R,2′′′R,2′′′′R,3R,3′R,3′′R,3′′′R,3′′′′S,4R,4′R,4′′R,4′′′S)-2,2′,2′′,2′′′,2′′′′-pentakis(3,4-dihydroxyphenyl)-3,3′,3′′,3′′′,3′′′′,4,4′,4′′,4′′′,4′′′′-decahydro-[4,8′:4′,8′′:4′′,8′′′:4′′′,8′′′′-quinque-2H-1-benzopyran]-3,3′,3′′,3′′′,3′′′′,5,5′,5′′,5′′′,5′′′′,7,7′,7′′,7′′′,7′′′′-pentadecol; (-)-Epicatechin-(4β→8)-(-)epicatechin-(4β→8)-(-)epicatechin-(4β→8)-(-)epicatechin-(4β→8)-(+)-catechin

Identifiers
CAS Number	86588-85-4
3D model (JSmol)	Interactive image
ChemSpider	17329415
KEGG	C17895
PubChem CID	16162334
- InChI: InChI=1S/C75H62O30/c76-28-16-41(88)51-50(17-28)101-68(24-2-7-31(78)37(84)12-24)63(97)59(51)53-43(90)20-45(92)55-61(65(99)70(103-73(53)55)26-4-9-33(80)39(86)14-26)57-47(94)22-48(95)58-62(66(100)71(105-75(57)58)27-5-10-34(81)40(87)15-27)56-46(93)21-44(91)54-60(64(98)69(104-74(54)56)25-3-8-32(79)38(85)13-25)52-42(89)19-35(82)29-18-49(96)67(102-72(29)52)23-1-6-30(77)36(83)11-23/h1-17,19-22,49,59-71,76-100H,18H2/t49-,59+,60-,61+,62-,63+,64+,65+,66+,67+,68+,69+,70+,71+/m0/s1 Key: QRFZGLTZLZZHCM-QSFSAXMJSA-N
- SMILES: OC1=C2C(=C(C(O)=C1)[C@H]3C=4C(=C(C(O)=CC4O)[C@H]5C=6C(O[C@@H]([C@@H]5O)C7=CC(O)=C(O)C=C7)=CC(O)=CC6O)O[C@@H]([C@@H]3O)C8=CC(O)=C(O)C=C8)O[C@@H]([C@H](O)[C@H]2C9=C%10C([C@@H]([C@@H](O)[C@H](O%10)C%11=CC(O)=C(O)C=C%11)C%12=C%13C(C[C@H](O)[C@H](O%13)C%14=CC(O)=C(O)C=C%14)=C(O)C=C%12O)=C(O)C=C9O)C%15=CC(O)=C(O)C=C%15

Properties
Chemical formula	C_{75}H_{62}O_{30}
Molar mass	1443.28 g/mol
- Except where otherwise noted, data are given for materials in their standard state (at 25 °C [77 °F], 100 kPa). Infobox references

Arecatannin B1
- Chemical structure of arecatannin B1.

Names
- IUPAC name (2R,3R,4S)-2-(3,4-dihydroxyphenyl)-4-[(2R,3S)-2-(3,4-dihydroxyphenyl)-3,5,7-trihydroxy-3,4-dihydro-2H-chromen-6-yl]-8-[(2R,3R,4R)-2-(3,4-dihydroxyphenyl)-3,5,7-trihydroxy-3,4-dihydro-2H-chromen-4-yl]-3,4-dihydro-2H-chromene-3,5,7-triol
- Other names: (-)-Epicatechin-(4β→8)-(-)-epicatechin-(4β→6)-(+)-catechin

Identifiers
CAS Number	79763-28-3
3D model (JSmol)	Interactive image
ChEBI	CHEBI:75642
ChemSpider	10290128
KEGG	C17892
PubChem CID	14237657
UNII	3S8S4BYC2M
- InChI: InChI=1S/C45H38O18/c46-18-10-26(53)33-32(11-18)62-43(16-2-5-21(48)24(51)8-16)40(59)37(33)35-27(54)13-28(55)36-38(41(60)44(63-45(35)36)17-3-6-22(49)25(52)9-17)34-29(56)14-31-19(39(34)58)12-30(57)42(61-31)15-1-4-20(47)23(50)7-15/h1-11,13-14,30,37-38,40-44,46-60H,12H2/t30-,37+,38-,40+,41+,42+,43+,44+/m0/s1 Key: PBYRKMXDROOXMU-XKDUFCMJSA-N
- SMILES: OC=1C(=C2C([C@@H]([C@@H](O)[C@H](O2)C3=CC(O)=C(O)C=C3)C=4C(O)=C5C(=CC4O)O[C@@H]([C@@H](O)C5)C6=CC(O)=C(O)C=C6)=C(O)C1)[C@H]7C=8C(O[C@@H]([C@@H]7O)C9=CC(O)=C(O)C=C9)=CC(O)=CC8O

Properties
Chemical formula	C_{45}H_{38}O_{18}
Molar mass	866.77 g/mol
- Except where otherwise noted, data are given for materials in their standard state (at 25 °C [77 °F], 100 kPa). Infobox references

Arecatannin B2
- Chemical structure of arecatannin B2.

Names
- IUPAC name (2R,3R,4R)-2-(3,4-dihydroxyphenyl)-4-[(2R,3R,4R)-2-(3,4-dihydroxyphenyl)-4-[(2R,3R,4S)-2-(3,4-dihydroxyphenyl)-4-[(2R,3S)-2-(3,4-dihydroxyphenyl)-3,5,7-trihydroxy-3,4-dihydro-2H-chromen-6-yl]-3,5,7-trihydroxy-3,4-dihydro-2H-chromen-8-yl]-3,5,7-trihydroxy-3,4-dihydro-2H-chromen-8-yl]-8-[(2R,3R,4R)-2-(3,4-dihydroxyphenyl)-3,5,7-trihydroxy-3,4-dihydro-2H-chromen-4-yl]-3,4-dihydro-2H-chromene-3,5,7-triol
- Other names: (-)-Epicatechin-(4β→8)-(-)-epicatechin-(4β→8)-(-)-epicatechin-(4β→8)-(-)-epicatechin-(4β→6)-(+)-catechin

Identifiers
CAS Number	86588-86-5
3D model (JSmol)	Interactive image
ChemSpider	30790814
KEGG	C17896
PubChem CID	71448962
- InChI: InChI=1S/C75H62O30/c76-28-16-40(87)51-50(17-28)102-69(24-2-7-31(78)36(83)12-24)64(97)59(51)53-41(88)19-43(90)55-61(66(99)71(104-73(53)55)26-4-9-33(80)38(85)14-26)57-45(92)21-46(93)58-62(67(100)72(105-75(57)58)27-5-10-34(81)39(86)15-27)56-44(91)20-42(89)54-60(65(98)70(103-74(54)56)25-3-8-32(79)37(84)13-25)52-47(94)22-49-29(63(52)96)18-48(95)68(101-49)23-1-6-30(77)35(82)11-23/h1-17,19-22,48,59-62,64-72,76-100H,18H2/t48-,59+,60-,61+,62-,64+,65+,66+,67+,68+,69+,70+,71+,72+/m0/s1 Key: OPJKXOWSIGSXPM-BFRGWOJKSA-N
- SMILES: OC=1C(=C2C([C@@H]([C@@H](O)[C@H](O2)C3=CC(O)=C(O)C=C3)C4=C5C([C@@H]([C@@H](O)[C@H](O5)C6=CC(O)=C(O)C=C6)C=7C(O)=C8C(=CC7O)O[C@@H]([C@@H](O)C8)C9=CC(O)=C(O)C=C9)=C(O)C=C4O)=C(O)C1)[C@H]%10C=%11C(=C(C(O)=CC%11O)[C@H]%12C=%13C(O[C@@H]([C@@H]%12O)C%14=CC(O)=C(O)C=C%14)=CC(O)=CC%13O)O[C@@H]([C@@H]%10O)C%15=CC(O)=C(O)C=C%15

Properties
Chemical formula	C_{75}H_{62}O_{30}
Molar mass	1443.28 g/mol
- Except where otherwise noted, data are given for materials in their standard state (at 25 °C [77 °F], 100 kPa). Infobox references

Arecatannin C1
- Chemical structure of arecatannin C1.

Names
- IUPAC name (2R,3S,4R)-2-(3,4-dihydroxyphenyl)-4-[(2R,3S)-2-(3,4-dihydroxyphenyl)-3,5,7-trihydroxy-3,4-dihydro-2H-chromen-8-yl]-8-[(2R,3R,4R)-2-(3,4-dihydroxyphenyl)-3,5,7-trihydroxy-3,4-dihydro-2H-chromen-4-yl]-3,4-dihydro-2H-chromene-3,5,7-triol
- Other names: Procyanidin C4; (-)-Epicatechin-(4β→8)-(+)-catechin-(4α→8)-(+)-catechin

Identifiers
CAS Number	87727-69-3
3D model (JSmol)	Interactive image
ChemSpider	8051720
KEGG	C17897
PubChem CID	9876038
- InChI: InChI=1S/C45H38O18/c46-18-10-27(54)33-32(11-18)61-42(16-2-5-21(48)25(52)8-16)39(59)37(33)35-29(56)14-30(57)36-38(40(60)43(63-45(35)36)17-3-6-22(49)26(53)9-17)34-28(55)13-23(50)19-12-31(58)41(62-44(19)34)15-1-4-20(47)24(51)7-15/h1-11,13-14,31,37-43,46-60H,12H2/t31-,37+,38+,39+,40-,41+,42+,43+/m0/s1 Key: MOJZMWJRUKIQGL-LKMJJRCWSA-N
- SMILES: OC1=C2C(=C(C(O)=C1)[C@H]3C=4C(O[C@@H]([C@@H]3O)C5=CC(O)=C(O)C=C5)=CC(O)=CC4O)O[C@@H]([C@@H](O)[C@@H]2C6=C7C(C[C@H](O)[C@H](O7)C8=CC(O)=C(O)C=C8)=C(O)C=C6O)C9=CC(O)=C(O)C=C9

Properties
Chemical formula	C_{45}H_{38}O_{18}
Molar mass	866.77 g/mol
- Except where otherwise noted, data are given for materials in their standard state (at 25 °C [77 °F], 100 kPa). Infobox references

Arecatannins are a class of condensed tannins in the sub-class procyanidins contained in the seeds of Areca catechu also called betel nut. The arecatannin-type natural products from Ceylonese cassia bark and Areca seed are examples of polyphenols by both current definitions, and fit the distinct definition of a polymeric phenol as well.

== Known molecules ==
The following six known arecatannins have been detected in A. catechu seeds.

- Arecatannin A1
- Arecatannin A2
- Arecatannin A3
- Arecatannin B1
- Arecatannin B2
- Arecatannin C1
