= Myclobutanil =

- Kekulé, skeletal formula of myclobutanil

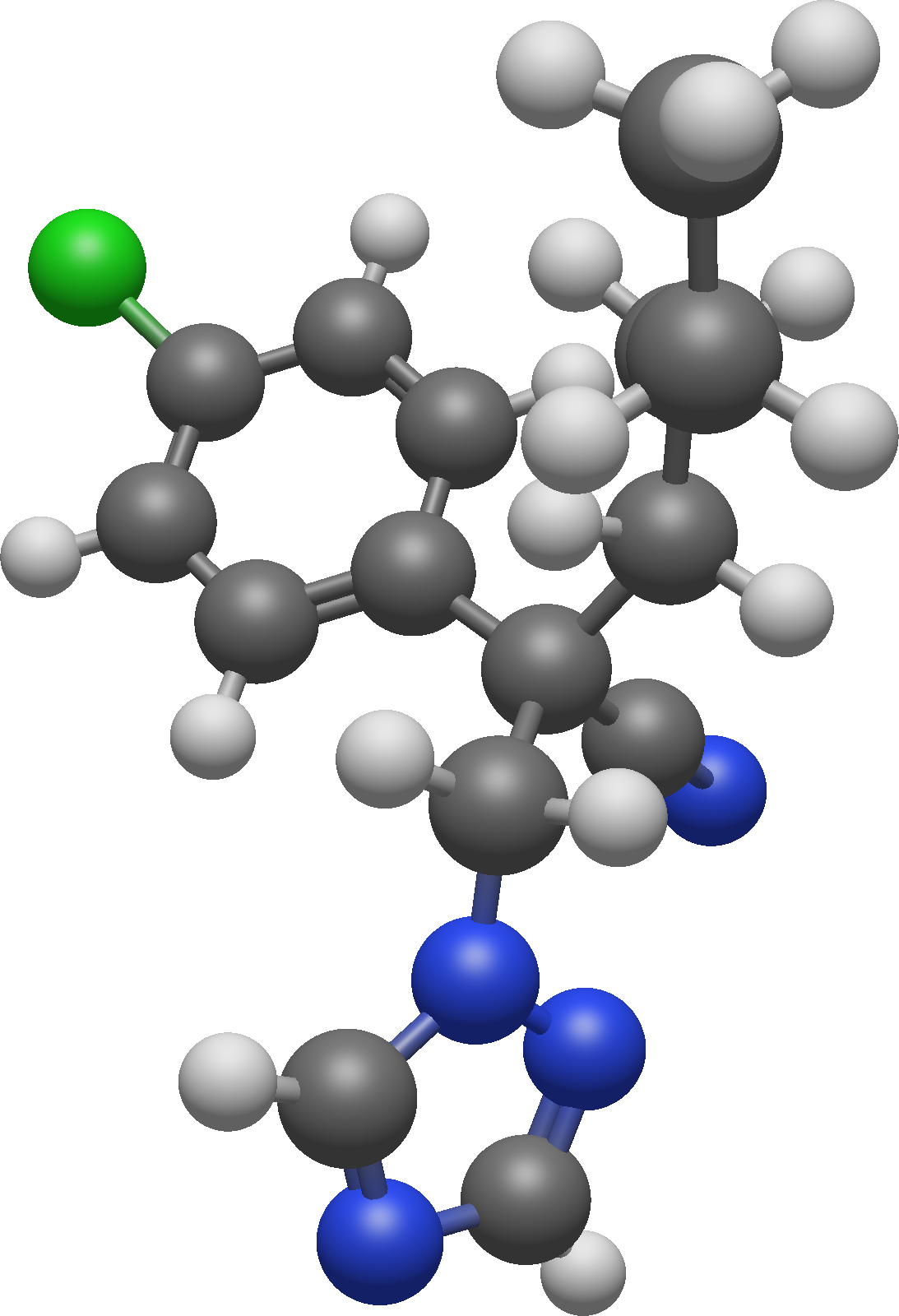
- Kekulé, skeletal formula of myclobutanil

Names
- IUPAC name 2-(4-Chlorophenyl)-2-(1,2,4-triazol-1-ylmethyl)hexanenitrile

Identifiers
CAS Number	88671-89-0
3D model (JSmol)	Interactive image
Beilstein Reference	7138849
ChEBI	CHEBI:75281
ChemSpider	6096; 9252226 (2R)
ECHA InfoCard	100.101.000
EC Number	410-400-0
KEGG	C18477
MeSH	Systhane
PubChem CID	6336; 11077077 (2R); 38989055 (2S)
RTECS number	XZ5257000
UNII	B6T1JTM6KZ
UN number	3077
CompTox Dashboard (EPA)	DTXSID8024315
- InChI: InChI=1S/C15H17ClN4/c1-2-3-8-15(9-17,10-20-12-18-11-19-20)13-4-6-14(16)7-5-13/h4-7,11-12H,2-3,8,10H2,1H3 Key: HZJKXKUJVSEEFU-UHFFFAOYSA-N
- SMILES: CCCCC(Cn1cncn1)(C#N)c1ccc(Cl)cc1

Properties
Chemical formula	C_{15}H_{17}ClN_{4}
Molar mass	288.78 g·mol^{−1}
Appearance	Pale, yellow, translucent crystals
Melting point	63 to 68 °C (145 to 154 °F; 336 to 341 K)
Boiling point	202 to 208 °C (396 to 406 °F; 475 to 481 K) at 130 Pa
Solubility in water	142 mg⋅dm^{−3}

Hazards
- GHS labelling
Pictograms	(GHS07: Exclamation mark) (GHS08: Health hazard) (GHS09: Environmental hazard)
Signal word	Warning
Hazard statements	H302, H319, H361, H411
Precautionary statements	P273, P281, P305+P351+P338
NFPA 704 (fire diamond)	2 1 0
Flash point	> 100 °C (212 °F; 373 K)
- Except where otherwise noted, data are given for materials in their standard state (at 25 °C [77 °F], 100 kPa). verify (what is ?) Infobox references

Myclobutanil is a triazole chemical used as a fungicide. It is a steroid demethylation inhibitor (CYP51) , specifically inhibiting ergosterol biosynthesis. Ergosterol is a critical component of fungal cell membranes.

== Stereoisomerism ==
Myclobutanil (2 stereoisomers)
(S)-configuration	(R)-configuration

== Safety ==
The Safety Data Sheet indicates the following hazards:

- Suspected of damaging fertility or the unborn child.
- Toxic to aquatic life with long lasting effects.

The first hazard has caused this chemical to be placed on the 1986 California Proposition 65 toxics list.

When heated, myclobutanil decomposes to produce corrosive and/or toxic fumes, including carbon monoxide, carbon dioxide, hydrogen chloride, hydrogen cyanide, and nitrogen oxides.

== Banned for cannabis cultivation ==
Myclobutanil is banned in Canada, Colorado, Washington, Oregon, Massachusetts, and Oklahoma for the production of medical and recreational cannabis. In 2014, a Canadian news investigation by The Globe and Mail reported the discovery of myclobutanil in medical cannabis produced by at least one government licensed grower. In September 2019, NBC News commissioned CannaSafe to test THC cartridges for heavy metals, pesticides, and residual solvents like Vitamin E; pesticides, including myclobutanil, was found in products from unlicensed dealers. In Michigan, the current state action limit for myclobutanil is 200 ppb in cannabis products.
