= Pectolinarin =

Names
- IUPAC name 5-Hydroxy-4′,6-dimethoxy-7-[α-L-rhamnopyranosyl-(1→6)-β-D-glucopyranosyloxy]flavone
- Systematic IUPAC name (4^{2}S,4^{3}R,4^{4}S,4^{5}S,4^{6}R,7^{2}R,7^{3}R,7^{4}R,7^{5}R,7^{6}S)-2^{5},4^{3},4^{4},4^{5},7^{3},7^{4},7^{5}-Heptahydroxy-1^{4},2^{6}-dimethoxy-7^{6}-methyl-2^{4}H-3,6-dioxa-2(2,7)-[1]benzopyrana-4(2,6),7(2)-bis(oxana)-1(1)-benzenaheptaphan-2^{4}H-one

Identifiers
CAS Number	28978-02-1
3D model (JSmol)	Interactive image
ChEMBL	ChEMBL445978
ChemSpider	147700
PubChem CID	168849
UNII	BY44L9O1RR
CompTox Dashboard (EPA)	DTXSID70951590
- InChI: InChI=1S/C29H34O15/c1-11-20(31)23(34)25(36)28(41-11)40-10-18-21(32)24(35)26(37)29(44-18)43-17-9-16-19(22(33)27(17)39-3)14(30)8-15(42-16)12-4-6-13(38-2)7-5-12/h4-9,11,18,20-21,23-26,28-29,31-37H,10H2,1-3H3/t11-,18+,20-,21+,23+,24-,25+,26+,28+,29+/m0/s1 Key: DUXQKCCELUKXOE-CBBZIXHGSA-N; InChI=1/C29H34O15/c1-11-20(31)23(34)25(36)28(41-11)40-10-18-21(32)24(35)26(37)29(44-18)43-17-9-16-19(22(33)27(17)39-3)14(30)8-15(42-16)12-4-6-13(38-2)7-5-12/h4-9,11,18,20-21,23-26,28-29,31-37H,10H2,1-3H3/t11-,18+,20-,21+,23+,24-,25+,26+,28+,29+/m0/s1 Key: DUXQKCCELUKXOE-CBBZIXHGBZ
- SMILES: C[C@H]1[C@@H]([C@H]([C@H]([C@@H](O1)OC[C@@H]2[C@H]([C@@H]([C@H]([C@@H](O2)OC3=C(C(=C4C(=C3)OC(=CC4=O)C5=CC=C(C=C5)OC)O)OC)O)O)O)O)O)O

Properties
Chemical formula	C_{29}H_{34}O_{15}
Molar mass	622.57 g/mol
- Except where otherwise noted, data are given for materials in their standard state (at 25 °C [77 °F], 100 kPa). Infobox references

Pectolinarin is a Cirsium isolate with anti-inflammatory activity and similar in chemical structure to linarin.

Chemical structure of linarin
