= Fenarimol =

Names
- IUPAC name (R/S)-2,4′-Dichloro-α-(pyrimidin-5-yl)benzhydryl alcohol
- Other names α-(2-Chlorophenyl)-α-(4-chlorophenyl)-5-pyrimidinemethanol

Identifiers
CAS Number	60168-88-9
3D model (JSmol)	Interactive image
ChEBI	CHEBI:83686
ChemSpider	39394
ECHA InfoCard	100.056.432
PubChem CID	43226
UNII	O088GU930Q
CompTox Dashboard (EPA)	DTXSID2032390
- InChI: InChI=1S/C17H12Cl2N2O/c18-14-7-5-12(6-8-14)17(22,13-9-20-11-21-10-13)15-3-1-2-4-16(15)19/h1-11,22H Key: NHOWDZOIZKMVAI-UHFFFAOYSA-N; InChI=1/C17H12Cl2N2O/c18-14-7-5-12(6-8-14)17(22,13-9-20-11-21-10-13)15-3-1-2-4-16(15)19/h1-11,22H Key: NHOWDZOIZKMVAI-UHFFFAOYAN
- SMILES: Clc1ccc(cc1)C(O)(c2ccccc2Cl)c3cncnc3

Properties
Chemical formula	C_{17}H_{12}Cl_{2}N_{2}O
Molar mass	331.20 g·mol^{−1}
Appearance	Colorless powder with aromatic odor
Melting point	117 to 119 °C (243 to 246 °F; 390 to 392 K)
Boiling point	240 °C (464 °F; 513 K) (decomposition)
Solubility in water	13.7 mg/L at 25 °C
Solubility in other solvents	Soluble in acetone, xylene and methanol
Vapor pressure	65 μ Pa (25 °C)

Hazards
- Lethal dose or concentration (LD, LC)
LD_{50} (median dose)	>2000 mg·kg^{−1} (oral, Rat)
- Except where otherwise noted, data are given for materials in their standard state (at 25 °C [77 °F], 100 kPa). Infobox references

Fenarimol, sold under the tradenames Bloc, Rimidin and Rubigan, is a fungicide which acts against rusts, blackspot and mildew fungi. It is used on ornamental plants, trees, lawns, tomatoes, peppers, eggplants, cucumbers and melons. It is mainly used to control powdery mildew. It works by inhibiting the fungus's biosynthesis of important steroid molecules (via blockade of the CYP51 enzyme).

== History ==
Fenarimol was developed by Eli Lilly and Company around 1971.

Derivatives of this compound are being researched in an open source manner for possible treatment of eumycetoma.

== Synthesis ==
Fenarimol is made by the reaction of 2,4'-dichlorobenzophenone with an organolithium pyrimidine made via bromine-lithium exchange.
