= Demethylating agent =

Demethylating agents are chemical substances that can inhibit methylation, resulting in the expression of the previously hypermethylated silenced genes (see Methylation#Cancer for more detail). Cytidine analogs such as 5-azacytidine (azacitidine) and 5-azadeoxycytidine (decitabine) are the most commonly used demethylating agents. They work by inhibiting DNA methyltransferases. Both compounds have been approved in the treatment of myelodysplastic syndrome (MDS) by Food and Drug Administration (FDA) in the United States. Azacitidine and decitabine are marketed as Vidaza and Dacogen respectively. Azacitidine is the first drug to be approved by FDA for treating MDS and has been given orphan drug status. Procaine is a DNA-demethylating agent with growth-inhibitory effects in human cancer cells. There are many other demethylating agents that can be used to inhibit the growth of other diseases.

== Mechanism of action ==
There is very little known about the mechanism of action of these drugs. However, it was shown in 2015 that a possible mechanism of action of these drugs in colorectal cancer-initiating cells is through activating dsRNA expression which leads to the activation of the MDA5/MAVS RNA recognition pathway inducing some sort of viral mimicry inside the cell.

== Clinical applications ==
The silencing of genes created by abnormal DNA methylation is a major contributor to the formation of cancerous tumors. Variations in DNA methylation of normal cells compared to malignant cells shows a prominent mechanism in how cancerous cells proliferate. Those variations are particularly prevalent in cell cycle regulation, DNA repair, and natural tumor suppression mechanisms. A leading therapeutic strategy in treating solid tumors stems from the use of demethylating agents to suppress DNA methylation in cancerous growths. Azacitidine and decitabine are both frequently used demethylating agents while decitabine is significantly more potent in its demethylating abilities. Both of these drugs are inhibitors of DNA Methyltransferases (DNMT) which are enzymes that are responsible for methylating DNA. In the 1970s, these drugs have shown promising results in hematological cancers in organisms such as mice. The FDA initially rejected the use of azacitidine clinically due to negative side effects caused by elevated toxicity levels. However, in later clinical trials performed on patients with MDS, myelodysplastic syndromes, azacitidine provided effective and exhibited consistent results which led to FDA approval in 2004. The commercial name of azacitidine became Vidaza. Decitabine, with the commercial name Dacogen, followed with FDA approval in 2006. As more research is completed in the field of genetic mutations, specifically involving DNA Methylation, these drugs can be utilized to their maximum efficiency to clinically treat cancerous tumors. As of 2017, there were no approved demethylating agents for the treatment of solid tumors which can be a focus of research in the future. Treatment utilizing demethylating agents can have further clinical use by targeting cancer stem cells and triggering apoptosis. Demethylating agents and their relevance in clinical studies as therapy to treat lymphocytic leukemia can be seen in. Procaine can also be used as therapeutic development to inhibit the growth of cancer cells in humans. There is a new world of possibilities of using demethylating agents to treat different diseases such as leukemia and cancer as therapeutic treatment.

Procaine (PCA) is a demethylating agent considered to be effective in inhibiting the growth of human cancer cells. Several studies have explored and elucidated the effects of procaine on human liver cancer cells and breast cancer cells. Studies have shown that procaine, as an inhibitor of DNA methylation in breast cancer cells, can effectively cause hypomethylation and demethylation of the entire group of breast cancer cell DNA genomes by reducing 5-methylcytosine DNA content. In addition, procaine can effectively restore the gene expression of tumor suppressor genes by demethylating densely hypermethylated CpG-enriched DNA. For human liver cancer cells, procaine is capable of reducing tumor volume by suppressing the cell viability of HLE, HuH7, and HuH6 cells, and it has shown effective inhibition of S/G2/M transition in HLE cells.

== See also ==
- DNA methylation
- DNA demethylation
