= Henk Tennekes (toxicologist) =

Dutch toxicologist (1950–2020)

- Born: 21 November 1950; Zutphen, Netherlands
- Died: 7 July 2020 (aged 69); Zutphen, Netherlands
- Occupation: Toxicologist

Henk Tennekes (21 November 1950 – 7 July 2020) was a Dutch toxicologist. Tennekes worked as doctor and researcher at the Philipps-Universiteit Marburg; the German research cancer centre Krebsforschungszentrum in Heidelberg; Sandoz in Muttenz, Switzerland and at the Research and Consulting Company in Itingen. Since 1992 he was an independent researcher.

Tennekes was born in Zutphen. He studied between 1968 and 1974 and earned his PhD in 1979 at the Wageningen University and Research with the thesis The Relationship between Microsomal Enzyme Induction and Liver Tumour Formation".

Tennekes wrote in 2010 the book "A disaster in the making", about the dangers of neonicotinoids, a new generation of pesticides for insects and bees in particular. He discovered that Bayer had researched the effects of neonicotinoid on flies back in 1991, and that the effect was irreversible. Bayer nowadays claims the contrary.

Initially, his vision had strong opposition as his findings were criticized, but follow-up research partially confirmed his warning. Since the end of 2018, the use of three neonicotinoids (clothianidin, thiamethoxam and imidacloprid) has been banned in the European Union. Tennekes who used to work as a freelance researcher for chemical companies found himself blacklisted, and lost all his clients, but that didn't deter him, because he considered it his moral duty.

Tennekes was suffering from a rare pulmonary disease, and opted for euthanasia. He died on 7 July 2020, aged 69.
