= Nitenpyram =

Insecticide

- Nitenpyram

Names
- Preferred IUPAC name (E)-N^{1}-[(6-Chloropyridin-3-yl)methyl]-N^{1}-ethyl-N′^{1}-methyl-2-nitroethene-1,1-diamine
- Other names Capstar

Identifiers
CAS Number	150824-47-8
3D model (JSmol)	Interactive image
Beilstein Reference	8489488
ChEBI	CHEBI:39170
ChEMBL	ChEMBL259728
ChemSpider	2298774
ECHA InfoCard	100.162.838
EC Number	601-735-5
KEGG	C18511
PubChem CID	3034287
UNII	3A837VZ81Y
CompTox Dashboard (EPA)	DTXSID8041080
- InChI: InChI=1S/C11H15ClN4O2/c1-3-15(11(13-2)8-16(17)18)7-9-4-5-10(12)14-6-9/h4-6,8,13H,3,7H2,1-2H3/b11-8+ Key: CFRPSFYHXJZSBI-DHZHZOJOSA-N
- SMILES: ClC1=CC=C(C=N1)CN(\C(=C\[N+](=O)[O-])\NC)CC

Properties
Chemical formula	C_{11}H_{15}ClN_{4}O_{2}
Molar mass	270.72 g/mol
Appearance	Pale yellow crystalline solid
Density	1.4 (g/mL)
Melting point	82 °C (180 °F; 355 K)

Hazards
- GHS labelling
Pictograms	(GHS07: Exclamation mark)
Signal word	Warning
Hazard statements	H302
Precautionary statements	P264, P270, P301+P312, P330, P501

Pharmacology
ATCvet code	QP53BX02 (WHO)
Legal status	US: OTC and Rx-only
- Except where otherwise noted, data are given for materials in their standard state (at 25 °C [77 °F], 100 kPa). verify (what is ?) Infobox references

Nitenpyram is a chemical frequently used as an insecticide in agriculture and veterinary medicine. The compound is an insect neurotoxin belonging to the class of neonicotinoids which works by blocking neural signaling of the central nervous system. It does so by binding irreversibly to the nicotinic acetylcholine receptor (nACHr) causing a stop of the flow of ions in the postsynaptic membrane of neurons leading to paralysis and death. Nitenpyram is highly selective towards the variation of the nACHr which insects possess, and has seen extensive use in targeted, insecticide applications.

Known under the codename TI 304 during field testing starting in 1989, the compound's first documented commercial use was in 1995 under the name "Bestguard" as an agricultural insecticide. Later, nitenpyram was expanded for use as a flea treatment by the Novartis company under the trade name "Capstar", with a subsequent FDA approval for non-food producing animals in October 2000. The current producer of nitenpyram itself is the Sumitomo chemical company. Nitenpyram continues to be used commercially, though data from market surveys indicate a significant decrease in the global usage compared to other insecticides or neonicotinoids.

Due to its use as an insecticide and treatment of non-food producing animals, it was not deemed necessary to research the human toxicology during its main use, and, as such, not much is known about the details of nitenpyram's effects on humans. Looking at rat experiments however, the lethal amount of nitenpyram is quite high (on the order of grams) in mammals in general, whereas invertebrates will die with only micro or nanograms of the substance.

Neonicotinoids, in general, have a low degradation rate when used for agricultural purposes, which allows for long-lasting protection of the crops against plant-sucking insects and indirectly the plant diseases these insects might carry.

In June 2026, the US Food and Drug Administration issued an emergency use authorization for nitenpyram for the treatment of New World screwworm infestations (myiasis) in dogs, puppies, cats, and kittens that weigh at least two pounds and are at least four weeks old. It is the first generic animal drug authorized for use against New World screwworm.

== Structure ==
Nitenpyram ( (E)-N-(6-Chloro-3-pyridylmethyl)- N-ethyl-N'-methyl-2-nitrovinylidenediamine) is an open-chain chloropyridyl neonicotinoid. Nitenpyram consists of a chloronicotinyl heterocyclic group common to all first generation neonicotinoids and a pharmacophore, the reactive group of the molecule. Nitenpyram possesses a nitroamine pharmacophore which is known to be the main reaction site in the binding of the compound to the nACh receptor, though the specificity of the reaction is not yet fully understood for neonicotinoids in general. Due to its polar groups, nitenpyram is quite hydrophilic, with an extremely high water solubility.

== Mechanism of action ==
Though neonicotinoids are the largest group of insecticides used in today's agricultural world and prevalent in veterinary treatments, toxicity in general, e.g., genotoxicity and biotransformation, remains among the most controversial matters on the topic of neonicotinoids. This is primarily due to the lack of concrete systematic work. However, studies have been done on binding phenomena between neonicotinoids and proteins, serving as an indicator to its likely behavior in human physiological conditions.

Nitenpyram, a synthetic, nicotine-related chemical (neonicotinoid), has an effect on the nicotinic acetylcholine receptors and, for this reason, is considered similar to nicotine (agonists). Nicotinic acetylcholine receptors are involved in the sympathetic and parasympathetic nervous systems, present on the muscle cells where the cells from the nervous systems and the muscle cells form synapses. Variations in nicotinic-acetylcholine-receptor-binding affinity persists between species.

Although nitenpyram is an agonist of nicotine for the nicotinic acetylcholine receptor, it has a much lower affinity for the nicotine acetylcholine receptor in mammals. Nitenpyram binds irreversibly to the nicotinic acetylcholine receptors, paralysing those exposed to the compound. Despite lower affinity levels, mammals can still get a nicotine poisoning response from too much neonicotinoids, hence it is of importance to provide the appropriate dose for a flea-infested pet and best practice to consult a vet.

Nitenpyram itself and its metabolites, apart from 6-chloronicotinic acid, have not been through in-depth toxicological investigations. Similarly genotoxicity effects remain ambiguous. 6-chloronicotinic acid, according to a research group, is non-carcinogenic and is not considered a developmental toxicant.

== Metabolism ==
The literature on the biotransformation of nitenpyram has been scarce. However, some studies have been conducted. Toxicokinetic studies have shown that human intestinal caco-2 cell line can absorb imidacloprid at a very high rate of efficiency. The compound completely absorbs (>92%) from the gastrointestinal tract, rapidly distributes from the intravascular space to the peripheral tissues and organs, like the kidney, liver and lungs, proceeding biotransformation. Vets and pet owners have reported the effect of nitenpyram on flea-infested pets starting within 30 minutes after administering the neonicotinoid.

Nitenpyram has been reported to metabolize into 6-chloronicotinic acid.

Nitenpyram in mice metabolizes into nitenpyram-COOH, nitenpyram-deschloropyridine, desmethyl-nitenpyram, nitenpyram-CN, and nitenpyram-deschloropyridine derivatives. The nitenpyram metabolites have not been through in-depth study. However, these metabolites can undergo oxidation reactions like the cyano group into a carboxylic group. 6-chloronicotinic acid can make hydrogen bonds with the hydrogen atom of amino groups.

Cytochrome P450 enzymes in humans could generate some metabolites with greater toxicity than the parent compound, certified to cause tumors in combination with nitrates and induce genetic damage. A precautionary approach to anything understudied would be advised, until the biotransformation is better and its effects are better studied and understood.

== Derivatives ==
Being a first generation neonicotinoid, nitenpyram has been subject to a variety of modifications to its original structure, to either increase the effectiveness or specificity of the compound. One such variation is on the configuration of the reactive group/pharmacophore, from cis (E) to trans (Z) configuration. It has been shown that this type of modification can substantially increase the affinity of nitenpyram to bind to the insect nACh receptor, allowing for more directed and ecologically friendly pest control. Changes to these compounds could also help circumvent the growing resistance in nitenpyram.

== Toxicology ==
=== Invertebrates ===
In a 2015 study, neonicotinoids toxicity was tested on the egg parasitoid Trichogramma. Nitenpyram specifically was found to have the lowest toxicity, making it useful in IPM (integrated pest management) treatment.

In 2015, researchers conducted a study on the toxicity of nitenpyram on the earthworm E. fetida. E. fetida is a common earthworm, which is partly responsible for the natural aeration of soil, including agricultural soil. In a 14-day exposure period, the Toxicity in LC50 of nitenpyram on E. fetida was found to be 4.34 mg/kg soil, showing an inhibition of cellulase activity and damage to the epidermal cells and gut cells. This, however, was significantly less toxic than similar insecticides such as imidacloprid, thiacloprid and clothianidin, making nitenpyram a viable substitute for many other neonicotinoids used.

Ecologic effects of nitenpyram on bee populations is under controversy, as contradicting studies show the presence of nitenpyram in honey bees and their honey, while others do not detect nitenpyram at all. This, however, may be due to the decrease in usage of nitenpyram, as the global market share has been steadily decreasing.

Nitenpyram is also commonly used in the elimination of and protection from mosquitoes. Specifically, the toxicity of nitenpyram on Culex quinquefasciatus or the southern house mosquito was tested. The LC50 of the compound was found to be 0.493 ug/ml.

=== Vertebrates ===
==== Aquatic animals ====
In a study a 60-day chronic toxicity test was conducted on Chinese rare minnows (Gobiocypris rarus) as a general fish model. Of the neonicotinoids tested (imidacloprid, nitenpyram, and dinotefuran), nitenpyram was shown to not have much genotoxic effects or adversely affect the immune system, either through short or chronic exposure in comparison to the other compounds.

In a similar study, nitenpyram was shown to have adverse effects on the DNA of Zebrafish. Enzymes inhibiting the formation of reactive oxygen species (ROS) were severely affected, causing oxidative DNA damage increasing with chronic exposure.

==== Mammals ====
The Oxford University chemical safety data documents an LD50 toxicology test on rats, both male and female, where doses are recorded as 1680 mg and 1575 mg per kg body weight respectively. As such, the overdose limits for humans and animals are quite high, reaching into grams, and the compound is seen as safe for daily use for animals. Human consumption is not recommended, though no side effects of indirect exposure (such as eating treated plants) are known to occur.

== Degradation ==
In the hope to understand neonicotinoid degradation in various types of water, an interesting find was made. In testing ground water, surface water and finished drinking water, researchers found degradation of nitenpyram was occurring primarily in the drinking water, which was attributed to hydrolysis of the compound. Some of these degradation products are thought to have toxic properties in non-target organisms, though the actual toxicities are not known. Nitenpyram is also degraded under the effect of UV light, suggesting that exposure to the sun will also degrade the compound into various degradation products.

== Veterinary applications ==
Nitenpyram tablets, brand name Capstar, are used to treat flea infestations in cats and dogs. After oral administration of the tablet the drug is readily and quickly absorbed into the blood. If a flea bites the animal it will ingest with the blood the nitenpyram. The effect of nitenpyram can be observed half an hour after the administration. At this time a high concentration in the plasma can be detected and the first fleas dislodge from the pet host. A study showed that six hours after application the infestation of fleas on decreased by 96.7% for dogs and 95.2% for cats. The adult fleas present on the hosts are severely interrupted, hence, egg production is reduced. Eggs are not directly affected by nitenpyram, only after they come out. Administering nitenpyram might have to be repeated or continued until the pest infestation has subsided. The half life of nitenpyram is around eight hours. Thus, 24 hours after treatment roughly 100% of the adult fleas were killed. Between 24 hours and 48 hours the efficacy is highly decreased and after 72 hours no effect could be shown anymore in studies.

=== Side effects ===
One observed side effect is itchiness, suspected to be from the fleas dislodging. In the five hours after the treatment it was observed that cats were grooming themselves more, i.e. scratching, biting, licking, and twitching. This will stop when the fleas have either flagged or have died. Other reported side effects are hyperactivity, panting, lethargy, vomiting, fever, decreased appetite, nervousness, diarrhea, difficulty breathing, salivation, incoordination, seizures, pupil dilation, increased heart rate, trembling and nervousness. In other studies no adverse effects were observed.

== Agricultural applications ==
Being one of the first generation neonicotinoids, nitenpyram has seen extensible commercial use since its introduction, including pest control in agriculture. While the development of newer generation nicotinoids has caused a decrease in its use, a Worldwide Integrated Assessment (WIA) report still judged it as an ecologically viable treatment in pest control projects such as Integrated Pest management (IPM). This is due to its lower toxicity and high uptake in plants in relation to soil as opposed to other commercially used neonicotinoids.

Nitenpyram has been used on many commercial crops, such as cotton and corn, and can be applicated in various ways. Commonly used techniques are dusting and seed treatment. Seed treatment allows for a long lasting immunity to insects damaging the crops. The use of nitenpyram has been shown to be highly effective in protecting crops, as it is generally less toxic for non-target organisms, while killing off crop-destroying insects. While usage is still common, unlike other neonicotinoids, the global market share for nitenpyram seems to decrease based on product sale data from 2003, 2005, 2007 and 2009. The reason for this is not yet fully understood, as other first generation neonicotinoids do not seem to follow the same trend, and nitenpyram is known to be less toxic to non-target organisms as compared to the compounds of the same generation.

However, the decrease of use could possibly be explained through the formation of resistance in various insect species. In a study conducted on nine commonly used nicotinoids, nitenpyram was found to have the greatest increase in resistance of the group within brown planthoppers, a common agricultural pest, between 2011 and 2012. A substantial increase of resistance was also found in Aphis gossypii or the cotton aphid, as compared to other compounds such as imidacloprid.

=== Side effects ===
Due to its use on pollen carrying plants, nitenpyram has been linked to a decrease in population of pollinators such as honey bees, wild bees and butterflies. Other non-target organisms, such as earthworms, are also reported to be negatively affected by nitenpyram. Plants themselves do not seem to have a negative response, as they do not possess nicotine nACh receptors.

== Synthesis ==
Nitenpyram is synthesized in a multistage reaction. The precursor compound of this reaction is 2-chloro-5-chloromethylpyridine, which is also used in the preparation of other neonicotinoids such as imidacloprid. The synthesis of this compound involved three reaction steps.

First step, 2-chloro-5-chloromethylpyridine reacts with ethylamine on its phase boundary acquiring the molecule N-ethyl-2-chloro-5-pyridylmethyl amine.

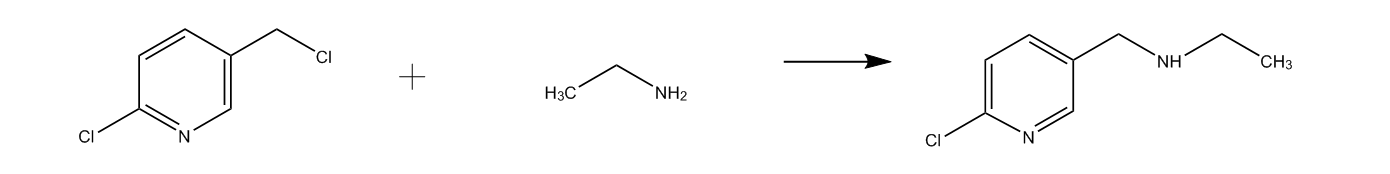

Synthesis can then proceed with a condensation reaction (step 2), in which reaction with trichloronitroethane will yield the intermediate N-ethyl-2-chloro-5-pyridylmethyl amine with an additional nitroethylene group.

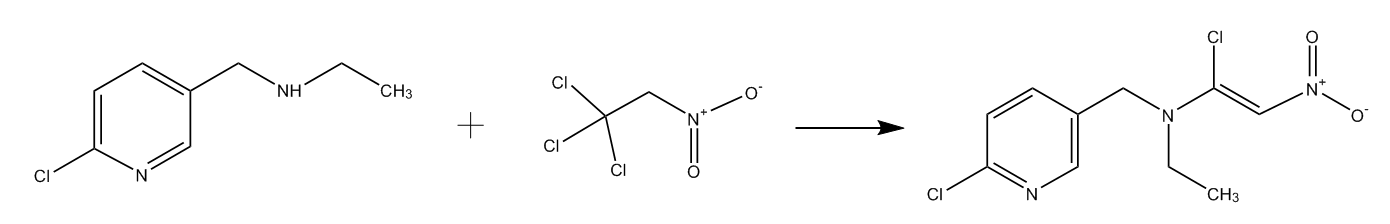

In the last step methylamine is added and reacts with the intermediate, replacing the pharmacophore chloride group, obtaining nitenpyram as the final end product.

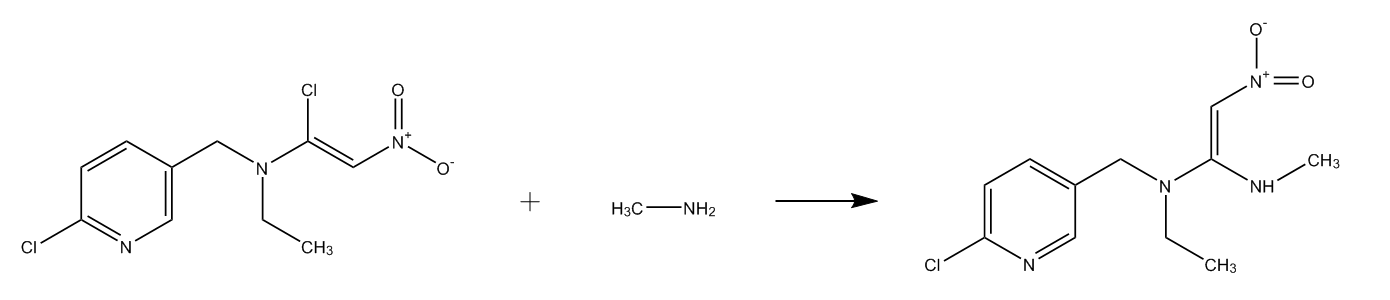
