= Desnitro-imidacloprid =

Names
- IUPAC name 1-(6-Chloro-pyridin-3-yl)methyl-2-iminoimidazolidine

Identifiers
CAS Number	115970-17-7
3D model (JSmol)	Interactive image
ChEMBL	ChEMBL309804
ChemSpider	8306043
PubChem CID	10130527
UNII	WT3F2K5PF2
CompTox Dashboard (EPA)	DTXSID90436011
- InChI: InChI=1S/C9H11ClN4/c10-8-2-1-7(5-13-8)6-14-4-3-12-9(14)11/h1-2,5H,3-4,6H2,(H2,11,12) Key: UEQZFAGVRGWPDK-UHFFFAOYSA-N
- SMILES: C1CN(C(=N1)N)CC2=CN=C(C=C2)Cl

Properties
Chemical formula	C_{9}H_{11}ClN_{4}
Molar mass	210.67 g·mol^{−1}
Appearance	Colorless crystals
- Except where otherwise noted, data are given for materials in their standard state (at 25 °C [77 °F], 100 kPa). Infobox references

Desnitro-imidacloprid is a metabolite of the insecticide imidacloprid, a very common insecticide and the most important member of the class of insecticides called neonicotinoids, the only significant new class of insecticides to be developed between 1970 and 2000. While imidacloprid has proved highly selective against insects, the desnitro- version is highly toxic to mammals, due to its agonist action at the alpha4beta2 nicotinic acetylcholine receptor (nAChR) in the mammalian brain, at least as demonstrated in experiments involving mice.
