= Cycloxaprid =

Names
- IUPAC name (1S,8R)-5-[(6-chloropyridin-3-yl)methyl]-7-nitro-11-oxa-2,5-diazatricyclo[6.2.1.02,6]undec-6-ene
- Other names: Cycloxaprid; (5S,8R)-1-[(6-chloro-3-pyridinyl)methyl]-2,3,5,6,7,8-hexahydro-9-nitro-5,8-Epoxy-1H-imidazo[1,2-a]azepine

Identifiers
CAS Number	1203791-41-6
3D model (JSmol)	Interactive image
ChEMBL	ChEMBL2227757
ChemSpider	31123584
PubChem CID	45278274
- InChI: InChI=1S/C14H15ClN4O3/c15-11-3-1-9(7-16-11)8-17-5-6-18-12-4-2-10(22-12)13(14(17)18)19(20)21/h1,3,7,10,12H,2,4-6,8H2/t10-,12+/m1/s1 Key: NDHXMRFNYMNBKO-PWSUYJOCSA-N
- SMILES: C1C[C@H]2N3CCN(C3=C([C@@H]1O2)[N+](=O)[O-])CC4=CN=C(C=C4)Cl

Properties
Chemical formula	C_{14}H_{15}ClN_{4}O_{3}
Molar mass	322.75 g·mol^{−1}

Hazards
- GHS labelling
Pictograms	(GHS07: Exclamation mark) (GHS08: Health hazard) (GHS09: Environmental hazard)
Signal word	Warning
Hazard statements	H302, H312, H315, H319, H332, H351, H410
Precautionary statements	P273, P280, P301+P312, P305+P351+P338, P501
- Except where otherwise noted, data are given for materials in their standard state (at 25 °C [77 °F], 100 kPa). verify (what is ?) Infobox references

Cycloxaprid is a neonicotinoid insecticide derived from the (nitromethylene)imidazole (NMI) analogue of imidacloprid. First reported in 2008., it is a novel insecticide developed to control pests that have developed resistance to imidacloprid, particularly targeting lepidopteran pests and whiteflies in rice cultivation. Currently, limited information is available regarding its environmental impact, ecotoxicology, or effects on human health.

== Chemistry ==
Cycloxaprid is distinguished by its unique chemical structure, featuring a nitro substituent in the cis-configuration, unlike other commercialized neonicotinoids which have the nitro group in the trans-configuration. It has demonstrated significant efficacy against insecticide-resistant pests, particularly showing 50-fold higher activity against imidacloprid-resistant brown planthopper compared to imidacloprid itself. This enhanced effectiveness against resistant pests makes it a promising alternative in pest management strategies, especially in contexts where repeated imidacloprid applications have led to resistance development.

Neonicotinoids represent the most commonly used class of insecticides globally, valued for their effectiveness against a wide spectrum of insect pests, particularly those in the orders Coleoptera, Diptera, and Lepidoptera. Their applications span both agricultural crop protection and animal health, with common usage methods including plant, soil, and seed treatments. However, ecological concerns have emerged regarding their environmental impact. Studies have documented that imidacloprid, a prominent neonicotinoid, can adversely affect various non-target organisms. These effects include impacts on pollinators and beneficial arthropods, manifesting in behavioral changes, population decline, reduced reproductive success, and increased mortality. Research has also revealed broader ecological consequences, including negative effects on aquatic macroinvertebrates, plankton, crayfish, and mollusks. Furthermore, studies have identified ecosystem-level impacts, such as disruption of songbird migration patterns and decreases in fishery productivity. These findings have motivated the development of alternative insecticides that maintain pest control efficacy while reducing environmental impact.

== Mechanism of action ==
Cycloxaprid’s mode of action was initially believed to be analogous to that of imidacloprid, likely impacting nicotinic acetylcholine receptors However, the exact mode of action is not fully understood.
