= Thiacloprid =

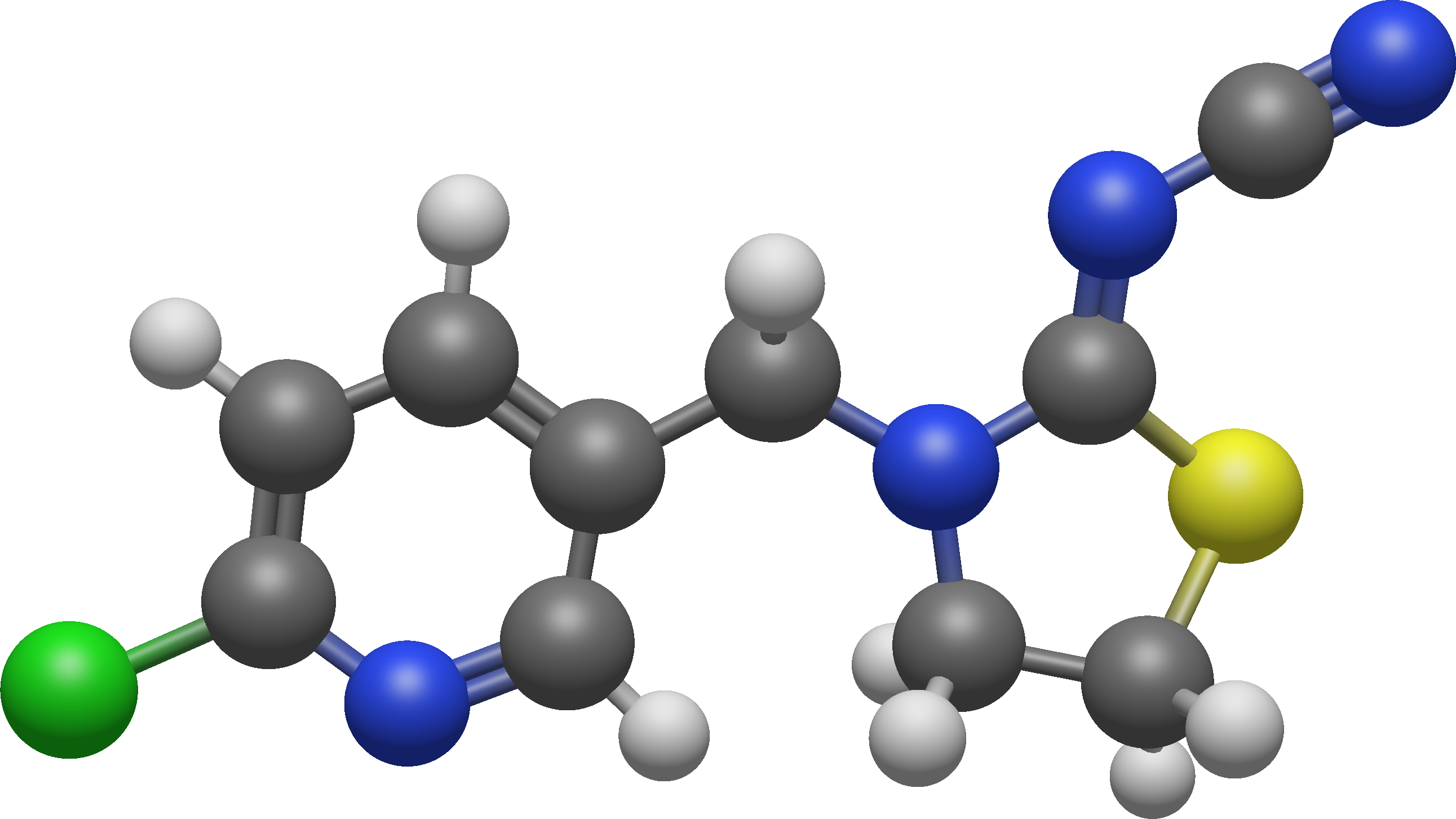

Names
- IUPAC name {(2Z)-3-[(6-Chloropyridin-3-yl)methyl]-1,3-thiazolidin-2-ylidene}cyanamide
- Other names [3-[(6-Chloro-3-pyridinyl)methyl]-2-thiazolidinylidene]cyanamide

Identifiers
CAS Number	111988-49-9
3D model (JSmol)	Interactive image
ChEBI	CHEBI:39176
ChEMBL	ChEMBL451432
ChemSpider	103099
DrugBank	DB08620
ECHA InfoCard	100.129.728
KEGG	C18512
PubChem CID	115224
UNII	DSV3A944A4
CompTox Dashboard (EPA)	DTXSID7034961
- InChI: InChI=1S/C10H9ClN4S/c11-9-2-1-8(5-13-9)6-15-3-4-16-10(15)14-7-12/h1-2,5H,3-4,6H2/b14-10- Key: HOKKPVIRMVDYPB-UVTDQMKNSA-N
- SMILES: Clc1ncc(cc1)CN2C(=N\C#N)\SCC2

Properties
Chemical formula	C_{10}H_{9}ClN_{4}S
Molar mass	252.72 g·mol^{−1}
Appearance	Yellowish crystalline solid
Density	1.46 g·cm^{−3} at 20 °C
Melting point	136 °C (277 °F; 409 K)
Solubility in water	185 mg/L at 20°C
- Except where otherwise noted, data are given for materials in their standard state (at 25 °C [77 °F], 100 kPa). verify (what is ?) Infobox references

Thiacloprid is an insecticide of the neonicotinoid class. Its mechanism of action is similar to other neonicotinoids and involves disruption of the insect's nervous system by stimulating nicotinic acetylcholine receptors. Thiacloprid was developed by Bayer CropScience for use on agricultural crops to control of a variety of sucking and chewing insects, primarily aphids and whiteflies.

== Regulation ==
Thiacloprid has been banned in France since September 1, 2018. The 5 neonicotinoids banned in France are Acetamiprid, Clothianidin, Imidacloprid, Thiacloprid and Thiamethoxam.
