= 2008 German beekill incident =

Disaster involving the deaths of millions of bees

The 2008 German beekill incident occurred in July 2008, when German authorities reported that more than 11,000 beehives were affected and millions of bees were killed in an agricultural chemical poisoning incident from late April to early May that year. Affected beekeepers reported that 50 to 100 percent of their hives had been lost after pneumatic equipment used to plant corn seed blew clouds of pesticide dust into the air, which was then pushed by the wind onto neighboring canola fields in which managed bees were performing pollinator services.

== Description ==
Laboratory testing at the Julius Kühn-Institut demonstrated that 99% of the bees sampled tested positive for high levels of the neonicotinoid pesticide clothianidin, which is highly toxic to honey bees on an acute contact basis (i.e. direct contact with too much of the chemical can quickly kill bees). In providing background on the incident, the German Federal Office of Consumer Protection and Food Safety (BVL) noted that clothianidin had been authorized as a seed treatment on corn since 2004, and that “bee damage of this kind in conjunction with this product has not been observed in Germany” prior to the 2008 incident.

== Contributing factors ==
In addition to the pneumatic equipment and dry, windy conditions that created the pesticide dust cloud and drove it into the neighboring fields, the BVL also identified several other factors that contributed to the incident. Though the normal corn seed treatment formulation of clothianidin was authorized for use against fruit flies and wireworms at 25 grams of the chemical per 50,000 seeds, the seed batches associated with this incident received a special authorization at a much higher concentration, 62 grams per 50,000 seeds, to protect against an infestation of western corn rootworm. Furthermore, a glue-like polymer coating, known as "sticker", that is commonly used in the U.S. to ensure that seed treatment pesticides adhere to corn seeds was omitted in error by the seed treater that supplied the seed to German farmers. Weather conditions earlier in the year also contributed to the incident. While corn planting would normally not take place in the Baden-Württemberg region of Germany at the same time that canola is in bloom, unseasonably early and heavy rain pushed back the corn planting.

== Regulatory authorities’ reaction to the incident ==
=== France ===
In Weakening, collapse and mortality of bee colonies. the French Food Safety Agency stated:

the causes of these incidents have been clearly identified and can be avoided by measures that are simple to apply, such as control of the quantity of dust emitted in batches by means of a test in comparison with a threshold...or the use of seed drills fitted with devices to limit dust emissions.

By their very nature, these types of incidents affecting bees and involving seed treatments are only liable to occur occasionally, since they require the emission of quantities that are toxic to bees. However, they reveal a dispersion of variable quantities of products used in film-coatings into the environment, and hence exposure that may have broader consequences, including on the health of the users of these products.

This observation led the ICPBR to designate this sowing practice as “poor farming practice” and to therefore encourage the rapid implementation of measures designed to solve this dust problem on a European level.

=== Germany ===
Before the investigation of the incident was complete, the BVL suspended the authorization of eight seed treatment products on corn and canola. Upon completion of its investigation, the German Federal Ministry of Food, Agriculture and Consumer Protection “banned for a period of 6 months the planting of maize by means of negative pressure pneumatic machines for single grain delivery; this ban applies to maize seeds treated with clothianidin or with one of three further insecticides.” Germany reauthorized the use of clothianidin as a seed treatment on canola in June 2008 after the Julius Kühn Institute submitted its findings that equipment and sticker problems associated with corn seed treatments in Germany are not applicable to canola. Furthermore, the German authorities explicitly required the use of additional sticker to ensure the pesticides adhere to the seeds. In June 2008, BVL concluded that “the treatment of rapeseed with clothianidin containing plant protection products does not put bee colonies at risk” but offered additional recommendations to better control dust and discouraging planting on windy days or using pneumatic seeding equipment that discharges air upward. In 2009, BVL decided to continue to suspend authorization for the use of clothianidin on corn, citing unanswered questions that remained about potential exposure of bees and other pollinators to neonicotinoid pesticides.

=== United States ===
Recognizing that the German incident resulted from a perfect storm of unusual factors, the United States Environmental Protection Agency (USEPA) took no regulatory action beyond confirming with “major seed suppliers and distributors, agricultural industry groups, and clothianidin’s registrant” that sticker use on corn seed is common practice in the U.S. The agency also explained the rationale for using seed treatments for pesticides over conventional application methods: "In many situations, the use of pesticide-treated seeds results in less human and environmental exposure than would the use of the pesticide later, in a spray or dust formulation, after the crop is growing." USEPA further noted that "though clothianidin was the particular chemical involved in the 2008 incident in Germany, a similar result would be expected if a large amount of any chemical that is toxic to bees was blown into the air on a dry, windy day next to blooming canola fields for which thousands of hives were providing pollination services."
