= Paichongding =

Names
- IUPAC name 1-[(6-Chloropyridin-3-yl)methyl]-7-methyl-8-nitro-5-propoxy-3,5,6,7-tetrahydro-2H-imidazo[1,2-a]pyridine

Identifiers
CAS Number	948994-16-9
3D model (JSmol)	Interactive image
ChEMBL	ChEMBL519270
ChemSpider	24718817
PubChem CID	44571837
CompTox Dashboard (EPA)	DTXSID9058498
- InChI: InChI=1S/C17H23ClN4O3/c1-3-8-25-15-9-12(2)16(22(23)24)17-20(6-7-21(15)17)11-13-4-5-14(18)19-10-13/h4-5,10,12,15H,3,6-9,11H2,1-2H3 Key: MOTGVPXRLDDMSK-UHFFFAOYSA-N
- SMILES: CCCOC1CC(C(=C2N1CCN2CC3=CN=C(C=C3)Cl)[N+](=O)[O-])C

Properties
Chemical formula	C_{17}H_{23}ClN_{4}O_{3}
Molar mass	366.85 g·mol^{−1}
- Except where otherwise noted, data are given for materials in their standard state (at 25 °C [77 °F], 100 kPa). Infobox references

Paichongding is an insecticide of the neonicotinoid class used to control sucking and chewing insect pests on various crops including rice.

It is widely used in China.
