= Immunotoxicology =

Study of the effect of toxins on the immune system

Immunotoxicology (sometimes abbreviated as ITOX) is the study of the toxicity of foreign substances called xenobiotics and their effects on the immune system. Some toxic agents that are known to alter the immune system include: industrial chemicals, heavy metals, agrochemicals, pharmaceuticals, drugs, ultraviolet radiation, air pollutants and some biological materials. The effects of these immunotoxic substances have been shown to alter both the innate and adaptive parts of the immune system. Consequences of xenobiotics affect the organ initially in contact (often the lungs or skin). Some commonly seen problems that arise as a result of contact with immunotoxic substances are: immunosuppression, hypersensitivity, and autoimmunity. The toxin-induced immune dysfunction may also increase susceptibility to cancer.

The study of immunotoxicology began in the 1970s. However, the idea that some substances have a negative effect on the immune system was not a novel concept as people have observed immune system alterations as a result of contact toxins since ancient Egypt. Immunotoxicology has become increasingly important when considering the safety and effectiveness of commercially sold products. In recent years, guidelines and laws have been created in the effort to regulate and minimize the use of immunotoxic substances in the production of agricultural products, drugs, and consumer products. One example of these regulations are FDA guidelines mandate that all drugs must be tested for toxicity to avoid negative interactions with the immune system, and in-depth investigations are required whenever a drug shows signs of affecting the immune system. Scientists use both in vivo and in vitro techniques when determining the immunotoxic effects of a substance.

Immunotoxic agents can damage the immune system by destroying immune cells and changing signaling pathways. This has wide-reaching consequences in both the innate and adaptive immune systems. Changes in the adaptive immune system can be observed by measuring levels of cytokine production, modification of surface markers, activation, and cell differentiation. There are also changes in macrophages and monocyte activity indicating changes in the innate immune system.

== Immunosuppression ==
Some common agents that have been shown to cause immunosuppression are corticosteroids, radiation, heavy metals, halogenated aromatic hydrocarbons, drugs, air pollutants and immunosuppressive drugs. These chemicals can result in mutations found in regulatory genes of the immune system, which alter the amount of critical cytokines produced and can cause insufficient immune responses when antigens are encountered. These agents have also been known to kill or damage immune cells and cells in the bone marrow, resulting in difficulty recognizing antigens and creating novel immune responses. This can be measured by decreased IgM and IgG antibody levels which are an indicator of immune suppression. T regulatory cells, which are critical to maintaining the correct level of response in the immune system, also appear to be altered by some agents. In the presence of certain immunotoxic substances, granulocytes of the innate immune system have also been observed to be damaged causing the rare disease agranulocytosis. Vaccine effectiveness can also be decreased when the immune system is suppressed by immunotoxic substances. In vitro T-lymphocyte activation assays have been useful when determining which substances have immunosuppressive properties.

== Hypersensitivity ==
Hypersensitive or allergic reactions, such as asthma, are commonly associated with immunotoxic agents and the number of people exhibiting these symptoms is increasing in industrial countries. This partially due to the increasing number of immunotoxic agents. Nanomaterials are commonly absorbed through the skin or inhaled and are known for causing hypersensitive responses by recruiting immune cells. These nanomaterials are often encountered when a person is in contact with chemicals in an occupational, consumer, or environmental setting. Agents that are known for creating a hypersensitive response include poison ivy, fragrances, cosmetics, metals, preservatives, and pesticides. These molecules that are so small, they act as haptens and bind to larger molecules to induce an immune response. An allergic response is induced when T lymphocytes recognize these haptens and recruit professional antigen-presenting cells. IgE antibodies are important when looking at hypersensitive reactions but cannot be used to definitively determine the effects of an immunotoxic agents. Because of this, in vivo testing is the most effective way to determine the potential toxicity of nanomaterials and other agents that are believed to cause hypersensitivity.

== Autoimmunity ==
Immunotoxic agents can increase the occurrence of immune system attacks on self molecules. Although autoimmunity mostly occurs as a result of genetic factors, immunotoxic agents such as asbestos, sulfadiazine, silica, paraffin and silicone can also increase the chance of an autoimmune attack. These agents are known for causing disturbances to the carefully regulated immune system and increasing the development of autoimmunity. Changes in the circulating regulatory and responder T cells are good indicators of an autoimmune response induced by an immunotoxic agent. The effects of autoimmunity have been examined primarily through studies with animal models. Currently, there is not a screen to determine how agents affect human autoimmunity, because of this much of the current knowledge about autoimmunity in response to immunotoxic agents comes from the observations of individuals who have been exposed to suspected immunotoxic agents.

== See also ==
- Journal of Immunotoxicology
- Toxicology
