= Imidacloprid =

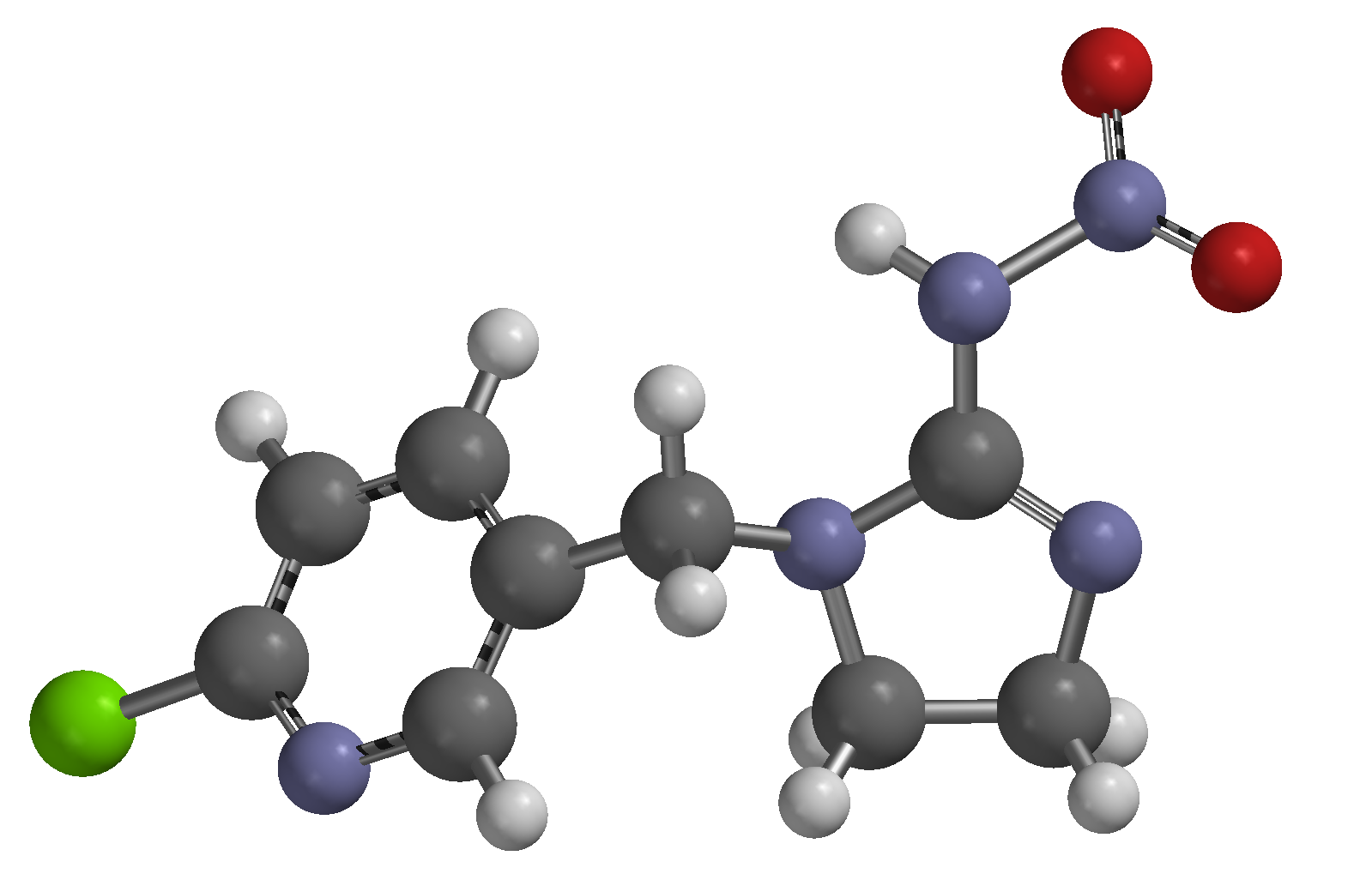

Names
- IUPAC name N-{1-[(6-Chloro-3-pyridyl)methyl]-4,5-dihydroimidazol-2-yl}nitramide

Identifiers
CAS Number	138261-41-3
3D model (JSmol)	Interactive image
ChEBI	CHEBI:39169
ChEMBL	ChEMBL406819
ChemSpider	77934
DrugBank	DB07980
ECHA InfoCard	100.102.643
KEGG	C11110
PubChem CID	86418
UNII	3BN7M937V8
CompTox Dashboard (EPA)	DTXSID5032442
- InChI: InChI=1S/C9H10ClN5O2/c10-8-2-1-7(5-12-8)6-14-4-3-11-9(14)13-15(16)17/h1-2,5H,3-4,6H2,(H,11,13) Key: YWTYJOPNNQFBPC-UHFFFAOYSA-N; InChI=1/C9H10ClN5O2/c10-8-2-1-7(5-12-8)6-14-4-3-11-9(14)13-15(16)17/h1-2,5H,3-4,6H2,(H,11,13) Key: YWTYJOPNNQFBPC-UHFFFAOYAZ
- SMILES: [O-][N+](=O)NC/1=N/CCN\1Cc2cnc(Cl)cc2

Properties
Chemical formula	C_{9}H_{10}ClN_{5}O_{2}
Molar mass	255.661
Appearance	Colorless crystals
Melting point	136.4 to 143.8 °C (277.5 to 290.8 °F; 409.5 to 416.9 K)
Solubility in water	0.51 g/L (20 °C)

Pharmacology
ATCvet code	QP53AX17 (WHO)
Legal status	CA: ℞-only
- Except where otherwise noted, data are given for materials in their standard state (at 25 °C [77 °F], 100 kPa). verify (what is ?) Infobox references

Imidacloprid is a systemic insecticide belonging to a class of chemicals called the neonicotinoids which act on the central nervous system of insects. The chemical works by interfering with the transmission of stimuli in the insect nervous system. Specifically, it causes a blockage of the nicotinergic neuronal pathway. By blocking nicotinic acetylcholine receptors, imidacloprid prevents acetylcholine from transmitting impulses between nerves, resulting in the insect's paralysis and eventual death. It is effective on contact and via stomach action. Because imidacloprid binds much more strongly to insect neuron receptors than to mammal neuron receptors, this insecticide is more toxic to insects than to mammals.

From 1999 through at least 2018, imidacloprid was the most widely used insecticide in the world. Although it is now off patent, the primary manufacturer of this chemical is Bayer CropScience (part of Bayer AG). It is sold under many names for many uses; it can be applied by soil injection, tree injection, application to the skin of the plant, broadcast foliar, or ground application as a granular or liquid formulation, or as a pesticide-coated seed treatment. Imidacloprid is widely used for pest control in agriculture. Other uses include application to foundations to prevent termite damage, pest control for gardens and turf, treatment of domestic pets to control fleas, protection of trees from boring insects, and in preservative treatment of some types of lumber products.

A 2018 review by the European Food Safety Authority (EFSA) concluded that most uses of neonicotinoid pesticides such as Imidacloprid represent a risk to wild bees and honeybees. In 2022 the United States Environmental Protection Agency (EPA) concluded that Imidacloprid is likely to adversely affect 79 percent of federally listed endangered or threatened species and 83 percent of critical habitats. The pesticide has been banned for all outdoor use in the entire European Union since 2018, but has a partial approval in the United States and some other countries. It still remains in widespread use in other major parts of the world.

== Use ==
Imidacloprid is one of the most widely used insecticides in the world. Its major uses include:

- Seed treatment – Imidacloprid is a popular seed treatment insecticide in the world
- Agriculture – Control of aphids, cane beetles, thrips, stink bugs, locusts, and a variety of other insects that damage crops
- Arboriculture – Control of the emerald ash borer, hemlock woolly adelgid, and other insects that attack trees (including hemlock, maple, oak, and birch)
- Home Protection – Control of termites, carpenter ants, cockroaches, and moisture-loving insects
- Domestic animals – Control of fleas (applied to the back of the neck)
- Turf – Control of Japanese beetle larvae (exp. Grubs)
- Gardening – Control of aphids and other pests

When used on plants, imidacloprid, which is systemic, is slowly taken up by plant roots and slowly translocated up the plant via xylem tissue.

=== Application to trees ===
When used on trees, it can take 30–60 days to reach the top (depending on the size and height) and enter the leaves in high enough quantities to be effective. Imidacloprid can be found in the trunk, the branches, the twigs, the leaves, the leaflets, and the seeds. Many trees are wind pollinated. But others such as fruit trees, linden, catalpa, and black locust trees are bee and wind pollinated and imidacloprid would likely be found in the flowers in small quantities. Higher doses must be used to control boring insects than other types.

=== Use in the United States ===
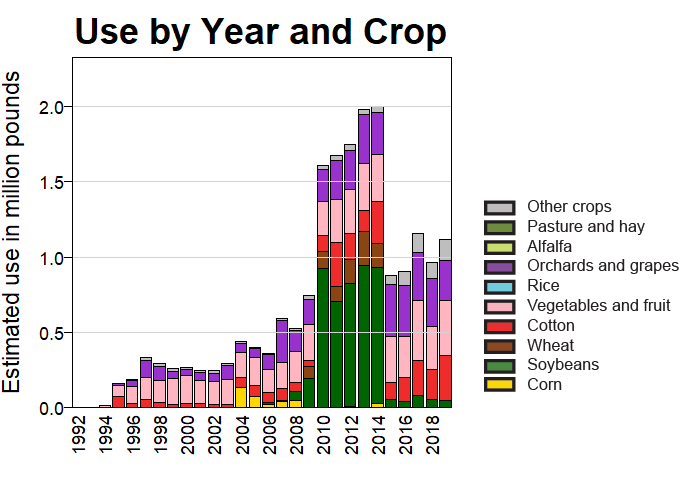
Imidacloprid use in the US to 2019

The estimated annual use of the compound in US agriculture is mapped by the US Geological Service and shows an increasing trend from its introduction in 1994 to 2014 when it reached 2,000,000 pounds (910,000 kg). However, use from 2015 to 2019 dropped following concerns about the effect of neonicotinoid chemicals on pollinating insects. In May 2019, the Environmental Protection Agency revoked approval for a number of products containing imidacloprid as part of a legal settlement, although some formulations continue to be available.

== History ==
On January 21, 1986, a patent was filed and granted on May 3, 1988, for imidacloprid in the United States (U.S. Pat. No. 4,742,060) by Nihon Tokushu Noyaku Seizo K.K. of Tokyo, Japan.

On March 25, 1992, Miles, Inc. (later Bayer CropScience) applied for registration of imidacloprid for turfgrass and ornamentals in the United States. On March 10, 1994, the U.S. Environmental Protection Agency approved the registration of imidacloprid.

On January 26, 2005, the Federal Register noted the establishment of the '(Pesticide Tolerances for) Emergency Exemptions' for imidacloprid. Its use was granted to Hawaii (for the) use (of) this pesticide on bananas(,) and the States of Minnesota, Nebraska, and North Dakota to use (of) this pesticide on sunflower(s).

=== Registrations ===
Imidacloprid is sold under several brand names, including Confidor (Bayer CropScience India), Marathon (OHP, US).

== Biochemistry ==
Imidacloprid is a systemic insecticide, belonging to the class of chloronicotinyl neonicotinoid insecticides. It works by interfering with the transmission of nerve impulses in insects by binding irreversibly to specific insect nicotinic acetylcholine receptors. It is in IRAC group 4A.

As a systemic pesticide, imidacloprid translocates or moves easily in the xylem of plants from the soil into the leaves, fruit, pollen, and nectar of a plant. Imidacloprid also exhibits excellent translaminar movement in plants and can penetrate the leaf cuticle and move readily into leaf tissue.

Since imidacloprid is effective at very low levels (nanogram and picogram), it can be applied at much lower concentrations (e.g., 0.05–0.125 lb/acre or 55–140 g/ha) than other insecticides. The availability of imidacloprid and its favorable toxicity package as compared to other insecticides on the market in the 1990s allowed the EPA to replace more toxic insecticides including the acetylcholinesterase inhibitors, the organophosphorus compounds, and methylcarbamates.

== Toxicology ==
Based on laboratory rat studies, imidacloprid is rated as "moderately toxic" on an acute oral basis to mammals and low toxicity on a dermal basis by the World Health Organization and the United States Environmental Protection Agency (class II or III, requiring a "Warning" or "Caution" label). It is rated as an "unlikely" carcinogen and as weakly mutagenic by the U.S. EPA (group E). It is not listed for reproductive or developmental toxicity, but is listed on EPA's Tier 1 Screening Order for chemicals to be tested under the Endocrine Disruptor Screening Program (EDSP). Tolerances for imidacloprid residues in food range from 0.02 mg/kg in eggs to 3.0 mg/kg in hops.

=== Mammals ===
Imidacloprid and its nitrosoimine metabolite (WAK 3839) have been well studied in rats, mice and dogs.

In dogs the LD_{50} is 450 mg/kg of body weight (i.e., in any sample of medium-sized dogs weighing 13 kilograms (29 lb), half of them would be killed after consuming 5,850 mg of imidacloprid, or about 1/5th of an ounce). The acute inhalation LD_{50} in rats was not reached at the greatest attainable concentrations, 69 milligrams per cubic meter of air as an aerosol, and 5,323 mg a.i./m^{3} of air as dust.

In mammals, the primary effects following acute high-dose oral exposure to imidacloprid are mortality, transient cholinergic effects (dizziness, apathy, locomotor effects, labored breathing) and transient growth retardation. Exposure to high doses may be associated with degenerative changes in the testes, thymus, bone marrow and pancreas. Cardiovascular and hematological effects have also been observed at higher doses.

The primary effects of longer term, lower-dose exposure to imidacloprid are on the liver, thyroid, and body weight (reduction). Low- to mid-dose oral exposures have been associated with reproductive toxicity, developmental retardation and neurobehavioral deficits in rats and rabbits. Imidacloprid is neither carcinogenic in laboratory animals nor mutagenic in standard laboratory assays.

It is not irritating to eyes or skin in rabbits and guinea pigs.

In humans, similar effects are expected. Primary effects following acute oral ingestion include emesis, diaphoresis, drowsiness and disorientation.

=== Bees ===
Imidacloprid is acutely toxic to honeybees: its LD_{50} ranges from 5 to 70 nanograms per bee. Honeybee colonies vary in their ability to metabolize toxins, which explains this wide range. Imidacloprid is more toxic to bees than the organophosphate dimethoate (oral LD_{50} 152 ng/bee) or the pyrethroid cypermethrin (oral LD_{50} 160 ng/bee). The toxicity of imidacloprid to bees differs from most insecticides in that it is more toxic orally than by contact. The contact acute LD_{50} is 0.024 μg active ingredient per bee.

In laboratory studies, sublethal levels of imidacloprid have been shown to impair navigation, foraging behavior, feeding behavior, and olfactory learning performance in honeybees (Apis mellifera). In general, however, despite the fact that many laboratory studies have shown the potential for neonicotinoid toxicity, the majority of field studies have found only limited or no effects on honeybees.

In bumblebees, exposure to 10 ppb imidacloprid reduces natural foraging behaviour, increases worker mortality and leads to reduced brood development. The probable mechanism is that the mevalonate pathway is substantially downregulated by the chronic imidacloprid exposure, which can help to explain the imidacloprid impairment of the cognitive functions.

=== Birds ===
Imidacloprid is considered acutely toxic to birds, and to cause avian reproductive toxicity.

In bobwhite quail (Colinus virginianus), imidacloprid was determined to be moderately toxic with an 14-day LD_{50} of 152 mg a.i./kg. It was slightly toxic in a 5-day dietary study with an acute oral LC_{50} of 1,420 mg a.i./kg diet, a NOAEC of < 69 mg a.i./kg diet, and a LOAEC = 69 mg a.i./kg diet. Exposed birds exhibited ataxia, wing drop, opisthotonos, immobility, hyperactivity, fluid-filled crops and intestines, and discolored livers. In a reproductive toxicity study with bobwhite quail, the NOAEC = 120 mg a.i./kg diet and the LOAEC = 240 mg a.i./kg diet. Eggshell thinning and decreased adult weight were observed at 240 mg a.i./kg diet.

Imidacloprid is highly toxic to four bird species: Japanese quail, house sparrow, canary, and pigeon. The acute oral LD_{50} for Japanese quail (Coturnix coturnix) is 31 mg a.i./kg bw with a NOAEL = 3.1 mg a.i./kg. The acute oral LD_{50} for house sparrow (Passer domesticus) is 41 mg a.i./kg bw with a NOAEL = 3 mg a.i./kg and a NOAEL = 6 mg a.i./kg. The LD_{50}s for pigeon (Columba livia) and canary (Serinus canaria) are 25–50 mg a.i./kg. Mallard ducks are more resistant to the effects of imidacloprid with a 5-day dietary LC_{50} of > 4,797 ppm. The NOAEC for body weight and feed consumption is 69 mg a.i./kg diet. Reproductive studies with mallard ducks showed eggshell thinning at 240 mg a.i./kg diet.

According to the European Food Safety Authority, imidacloprid poses a potential high acute risk for both herbivorous and insectivorous birds. Chronic risk has not been well established.

A 2014 observational study conducted in the Netherlands correlated declines in some bird populations with environmental imidacloprid residues, although it stopped short of concluding that the association was causal.

=== Aquatic life ===
Imidacloprid is highly toxic on an acute basis to aquatic invertebrates, with EC_{50} values = 0.037 - 0.115 ppm. It is also highly toxic to aquatic invertebrates on a chronic basis (effects on growth and movement): NOAEC/LOAEC = 1.8/3.6 ppm in daphnids; NOAEC = 0.001 in Chironomus midge, and NOAEC/LOAEC = 0.00006/0.0013 ppm in mysid shrimp.

Its toxicity to fish is relatively low; however, the EPA has requested review of secondary effects on fish with food chains that include sensitive aquatic invertebrates. Research published in 2018 demonstrated accumulation of imidacloprid in the blood of rainbow trout, contradicting claims from Bayer that persistence (bioaccumulation) does not occur with imidacloprid.

=== Plant life ===
Imidacloprid has been shown to turn off some genes that some rice varieties use to produce defensive chemicals. While imidacloprid is used for control of the brown planthopper and other rice pests, there is evidence that imidacloprid actually increases the susceptibility of the rice plant to planthopper infestation and attacks. Imidacloprid has been shown to increase the rate of photosynthesis in upland cotton at temperatures above 36 degrees Celsius (97 degrees Fahrenheit).

== Environmental fate ==
The main routes of dissipation of imidacloprid in the environment are aqueous photolysis (half-life = 1–4 hours) and plant uptake. The major photometabolites include imidacloprid desnitro, imidacloprid olefine, imidacloprid urea, and five minor metabolites. The end product of photodegradation is 6-chloronicotinic acid (6-CNA) and ultimately carbon dioxide. Since imidacloprid has a low vapor pressure, it normally does not volatilize readily.

Although imidacloprid breaks down rapidly in water in the presence of light, it remains persistent in water in the absence of light. It has a water solubility of .61 g/L, which is relatively high. In the dark, at pH between 5 and 7, it breaks down very slowly, and at pH 9, the half-life is about 1 year. In soil under aerobic conditions, imidacloprid is persistent with a half-life of the order of 1–3 years. On the soil surface, the half-life is 39 days. Major soil metabolites include imidacloprid nitrosimine, imidacloprid desnitro and imidacloprid urea, which ultimately degrade to 6-chloronicotinic acid, CO_{2}, and bound residues. 6-Chloronicotinic acid is recently shown to be mineralized via a nicotinic acid (vitamin B_{3}) pathway in a soil bacterium.

In soil, imidacloprid strongly binds to organic matter. When not exposed to light, imidacloprid breaks down slowly in water, and thus has the potential to persist in groundwater for extended periods. However, in a survey of groundwater in areas of the United States which had been treated with imidacloprid for the emerald ash borer, imidacloprid was usually not detected. When detected, it was present at very low levels, mostly at concentrations less than 1 part per billion (ppb) with a maximum of 7 ppb, which are below levels of concern for human health. The detections have generally occurred in areas with porous rocky or sandy soils with little organic matter, where the risk of leaching is high — and/or where the water table was close to the surface.

Based on its high water solubility (0.5-0.6 g/L) and persistence, both the U.S. Environmental Protection Agency and the Pest Management Regulatory Agency in Canada consider imidacloprid to have a high potential to run off into surface water and to leach into ground water and thus warn not to apply it in areas where soils are permeable, particularly where the water table is shallow.

According to standards set by the environmental ministry of Canada, if used correctly (at recommended rates, without irrigation, and when heavy rainfall is not predicted), imidacloprid does not characteristically leach into the deeper soil layers despite its high water solubility (Rouchaud et al. 1994; Tomlin 2000; Krohn and Hellpointner 2002). In a series of field trials conducted by Rouchaud et al. (1994, 1996), in which imidacloprid was applied to sugar beet plots, it was consistently demonstrated that no detectable leaching of imidacloprid to the 10–20 cm soil layer occurred. Imidacloprid was applied to a corn field in Minnesota, and no imidacloprid residues were found in sample column segments below the 0–15.2 cm depth segment (Rice et al. 1991, as reviewed in Mulye 1995).

However, a 2012 water monitoring study by the state of California, performed by collecting agricultural runoff during the growing seasons of 2010 and 2011, found imidacloprid in 89% of samples, with levels ranging from 0.1 to 3.2 μg/L. 19% of the samples exceeded the EPA threshold for chronic toxicity for aquatic invertebrates of 1.05 μg/L. The authors also point out that Canadian and European guidelines are much lower (0.23 μg/L and 0.067 μg/L, respectively) and were exceeded in 73% and 88% of the samples, respectively. The authors concluded that "imidacloprid commonly moves offsite and contaminates surface waters at concentrations that could harm aquatic invertebrates".

== Regulation ==
=== European Union ===
In the mid to late 1990s, French beekeepers reported a significant loss of bees, which they attributed to the use of imidacloprid. In 1999, the French Minister of Agriculture suspended the use of imidacloprid on sunflower seeds and appointed a team of expert scientists to examine the impact of imidacloprid on bees. In 2003, this panel issued a report which concluded that imidacloprid posed a significant risk to bees. In 2004, the French Minister of Agriculture suspended the use of imidacloprid as a seed treatment for sunflowers and maize (corn). Certain imidacloprid seed treatments were also temporarily banned in Italy, following preliminary monitoring studies that identified correlations between bee losses and the use of neonicotinoid pesticides.

In January 2013, a European Food Safety Authority (EFSA) report concluded that neonicotinoids posed an unacceptably high risk to bees: "A high acute risk to honey bees was identified from exposure via dust drift for the seed treatment uses in maize, oilseed rape and cereals. A high acute risk was also identified from exposure via residues in nectar and/or pollen." The EFSA also identified a number of gaps in the scientific evidence and were unable to finalize risk assessments for some uses authorized in the European Union (EU). Following the report, EU member states voted to restrict the use of the three main neonics, including imidacloprid, for seed treatment, soil application (granules) and foliar treatment in crops attractive to bees.

In February 2018, the European Food Safety Authority published a further report concluding that neonicotinoids posed a serious danger to bees. In April 2018, the member states of the EU decided to ban the neonicotinoids for all outdoor uses.

=== United States ===
On July 1, 2022, the Commonwealth of Massachusetts in the United States banned commercial sales of imidacloprid and other neonicotinoids – acetamiprid, clothianidin, dinotefuran, thiacloprid, and thiamethoxam – to the general public for all outdoor uses. Licensed dealers will be able to sell only to pesticide-licensed and certified individuals. The states of Maryland, Connecticut and Vermont also restrict use of neonicotinoid pesticides. On January 1, 2025 the state of California limited the sale and use of acetamiprid, clothianidin, dinotefuran, imidacloprid, and thiamethoxam to licensed pesticide dealers and applicators only. Beginning January 1, 2026, the state of Washington disallows the use unless as part of a licensed application, and the sale and use is limited to licensed pesticide dealers and applicators only. This includes previously mentioned pesticides in addition to nitenpyram and nithiazine.

== See also ==
- Insecticide
- Neonicotinoid
- Pesticide toxicity to bees
