= Imidaclothiz =

Insecticide

Names
- IUPAC name N-[1-[(2-Chloro-1,3-thiazol-5-yl)methyl]-4,5-dihydroimidazol-2-yl]nitramide

Identifiers
CAS Number	105843-36-5
3D model (JSmol)	Interactive image
ChemSpider	160503
PubChem CID	184601
UNII	E070T0J4TU
CompTox Dashboard (EPA)	DTXSID4057926
- InChI: InChI=1S/C7H8ClN5O2S/c8-6-10-3-5(16-6)4-12-2-1-9-7(12)11-13(14)15/h3H,1-2,4H2,(H,9,11) Key: OWRSHPAYDYCHSJ-UHFFFAOYSA-N
- SMILES: C1CN(C(=N1)N[N+](=O)[O-])CC2=CN=C(S2)Cl

Properties
Chemical formula	C_{7}H_{8}ClN_{5}O_{2}S
Molar mass	261.68 g·mol^{−1}
- Except where otherwise noted, data are given for materials in their standard state (at 25 °C [77 °F], 100 kPa). Infobox references

Imidaclothiz is an insecticide of the neonicotinoid class used to control sucking and chewing insect pests on various crops.

It is approved for use in China.
