= Lynn Dicks =

British conservation scientist and ecologist

- Education: University of Oxford (BA) University of Cambridge (PhD)
- Scientific career
- Workplaces: University of Cambridge, University of East Anglia

Lynn Dicks is a conservation scientist and ecologist in the UK. She is a Professor of Ecology at the University of Cambridge, Honorary Reader at the University of East Anglia, and an expert in sustainable farming and insect conservation.

== Education and career ==
Dicks was educated at Great Yarmouth High School and won a scholarship to Norwich High School for Girls for sixth form. She studied at New College, Oxford, and was awarded a first class degree in Biological Sciences in 1995. She graduated from the University of Cambridge with a PhD in the community ecology of flower-visiting insects in 2002. She worked as a science writer before returning to academia as a postdoctoral researcher and then NERC research fellow at the University of Cambridge. Dicks moved to the University of East Anglia in 2016 as a research fellow and in 2019 was appointed a Reader in the School of Biological Sciences. In 2019 she moved back to Cambridge as a Lecturer in Animal Ecology and NERC Independent Research Fellow and is a visiting lecturer at UEA. In 2020, she became a Fellow of Selwyn College, Cambridge. In 2023 Dicks was appointed Board Member to non-departmental public body Natural England. In June 2023 she was promoted to Professor of Ecology within the University of Cambridge.

== Research ==
Dicks' research focuses on insect conservation, agricultural ecology, agricultural policy and the food and farming industry. She supports evidence based practice and policy for sustainable agricultural management and conservation interventions. Dicks' research has shown a need for redundancy in natural ecosystems, that is a need for extra resources and species to create longterm resilience.

She collaborates internationally, and was a 'Coordinating Lead Author' for the international assessment of pollinating animals in conjunction with the IPBES in 2016. Dicks has highlighted the importance of insect pollinators for food crops such as chocolate and coffee and supported the 2013 EU moratorium and subsequent ban on neonicotinoid insecticides. Dicks has also researched the importance of vertebrate pollinators such as birds and bats and has been involved in horizon scanning to find future threats to pollinators such as agricultural expansions, use of agrochemicals and emerging disease. Her research has shown a lack of awareness of how pollinator decline could affect food supply chains.

As well as pollinating insects, Dicks also promotes the important of insects for biological control and decomposition

== Awards ==
In 1999, Dicks won the Daily Telegraph Young Science Writer of the Year Award.

Dicks was awarded the John Spedan Lewis Medal in 2017 for making a significant and innovative contribution to conservation.

In 2018 Dicks was awarded the DEFRA Bees' Needs Champion Award for raising public awareness of the needs of pollinators.

In 2022 Dicks was awarded the British Ecological Society's Ecological Engagement Award which recognises an ecologist who has bridged the gap between ecology and other groups.
