= Nithiazine =

Chemical compound

Names
- IUPAC name (E/Z)-2-Nitromethylene-1,3-thiazinane

Identifiers
CAS Number	58842-20-9
3D model (JSmol)	Interactive image
ChEMBL	ChEMBL3138618
ChemSpider	5013776
ECHA InfoCard	100.107.942
EC Number	611-751-4
PubChem CID	42853
UNII	F1T7M9EJMU
CompTox Dashboard (EPA)	DTXSID7034256
- InChI: InChI=1S/C5H8N2O2S/c8-7(9)4-5-6-2-1-3-10-5/h4,6H,1-3H2/b5-4-
- SMILES: O=[N+](C=C1SCCCN1)[O-]

Properties
Chemical formula	C_{5}H_{8}N_{2}O_{2}S
Molar mass	160.19 g·mol^{−1}
Appearance	Crystals or brown powder
Density	1.388 g/cm^{3}

Hazards
- GHS labelling
Pictograms	(GHS07: Exclamation mark)
Signal word	Warning
Hazard statements	H302, H312, H315, H319, H332, H335
Precautionary statements	P261, P264, P270, P271, P280, P301+P312, P302+P352, P304+P312, P304+P340, P305+P351+P338, P312, P321, P322, P330, P332+P313, P337+P313, P362, P363, P403+P233, P405, P501
- Except where otherwise noted, data are given for materials in their standard state (at 25 °C [77 °F], 100 kPa). Infobox references

Nithiazine is a nitromethylene neonicotinoid insecticide. It is irritating to the eyes and skin, and is moderately toxic to mammals.

Nithiazine does not act as an acetylcholinesterase inhibitor.
