= Journal of Immunotoxicology =

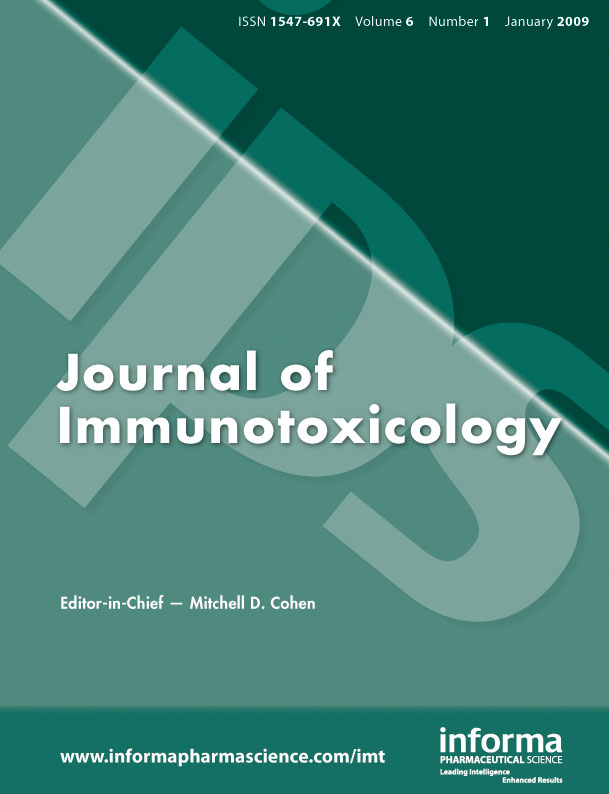
- Discipline: Toxicology, immunology
- Language: English
- Edited by: Mitchell D. Cohen

Publication details
- History: 2004-present
- Publisher: Informa Pharmaceutical Science (United Kingdom)
- Frequency: Quarterly
- Impact factor: 2.054 (2014)

Standard abbreviations
- ISO 4: J. Immunotoxicol.

Indexing
- ISSN: 1547-691X (print); 1547-6901 (web)

Links
- Journal homepage

The Journal of Immunotoxicology is a quarterly peer-reviewed scientific journal that publishes articles in the fields of immunotoxicology, immunology, and toxicology. It is published by Informa.

== Aims and scope ==
The journal publishes findings about the immunomodulating effects, as well as mechanisms of activity, of:

- industrial chemicals
- pharmaceuticals
- environmental contaminants
- food products
- radiation
- stressors

== Editor in chief and impact factor ==
The editor in chief of the Journal of Immunotoxicology is Mitchell D. Cohen (New York University School of Medicine, Tuxedo, New York, United States.

According to the Journal Citation Reports it received an impact factor of 2.054, ranking it 55th out of 87 journals in the category "Toxicology".
