= Clothianidin =

- Partially condensed, Kekulé, skeletal formula

Names
- IUPAC name 1-(2-Chloro-1,3-thiazol-5-ylmethyl)-3-methyl-2-nitroguanidine

Identifiers
CAS Number	210880-92-5 (E)
3D model (JSmol)	Interactive image
Beilstein Reference	9196326, 8620724 (E)
ChEBI	CHEBI:39178
ChEMBL	ChEMBL259727
ChemSpider	184723 (E)
ECHA InfoCard	100.103.171
KEGG	C18508
MeSH	Clothianidin
PubChem CID	86287519 (E)
UNII	2V9906ABKQ (E)
CompTox Dashboard (EPA)	DTXSID2034465
- InChI: InChI=1S/C6H8ClN5O2S/c1-8-6(11-12(13)14)10-3-4-2-9-5(7)15-4/h2H,3H2,1H3,(H2,8,10,11) Key: PGOOBECODWQEAB-UHFFFAOYSA-N; InChI=1/C6H8ClN5O2S/c1-8-6(11-12(13)14)10-3-4-2-9-5(7)15-4/h2H,3H2,1H3,(H2,8,10,11) Key: PGOOBECODWQEAB-UHFFFAOYAT
- SMILES: CNC(N[N+]([O-])=O)=NCC1=CN=C(Cl)S1

Properties
Chemical formula	C_{6}H_{8}ClN_{5}O_{2}S
Molar mass	249.67 g·mol^{−1}
Appearance	Colorless crystals
Density	1.61 g cm^{−3}
Melting point	179 °C (354 °F; 452 K)
Solubility in water	327 mg/L (at 20 °C)
log P	0.732
Acidity (pK_{a})	7.472
Basicity (pK_{b})	6.525
- Except where otherwise noted, data are given for materials in their standard state (at 25 °C [77 °F], 100 kPa). verify (what is ?) Infobox references

Clothianidin is an insecticide developed by Takeda Chemical Industries and Bayer AG. Similar to thiamethoxam and imidacloprid, it is a neonicotinoid. Neonicotinoids are a class of insecticides that are chemically similar to nicotine, which has been used as a pesticide since the late 1700s. Clothianidin and other neonicotinoids act on the central nervous system of insects as an agonist of nAChR, the same receptor as acetylcholine, the neurotransmitter that stimulates and activating post-synaptic acetylcholine receptors but not inhibiting AChE. Clothianidin and other neonicotinoids were developed to last longer than nicotine, which is more toxic and which breaks down too quickly in the environment.

A 2018 review by the European Food Safety Authority (EFSA) concluded that most uses of neonicotinoid pesticides such as clothianidin represent a risk to wild bees and honeybees. In 2022 the United States Environmental Protection Agency (EPA) concluded that clothianidin is likely to adversely affect 67 percent of federally listed endangered or threatened species and 56 percent of critical habitats. The pesticide has been banned for all outdoor use in the entire European Union since 2018, but has a conditional approval in the U.S. and other parts of the world, where it is widely used.

Clothianidin is an alternative to organophosphate, carbamate, and pyrethroid pesticides. It poses lower risks to mammals, including humans, when compared to organophosphates and carbamates. It has helped prevent insect pests from building up resistance to organophosphate and pyrethroid pesticides.

== Authorized uses ==
Clothianidin is authorized for spray, dust, soil drench (for uptake via plant roots), injectable liquid (into tree limbs and trunks, sugar cane stalks etc.), and seed treatment uses, in which clothianidin coats seeds that take up the pesticide via the roots as the plant grows. The chemical may be used to protect plants against a wide variety of agricultural pests in many countries, of which the following are mentioned in citable English-language sources: Australia, Austria, Belgium, Bulgaria, Canada, Czech Republic, Denmark, Estonia, France, Finland, Germany, Greece, Hungary, Italy, Ireland, Japan, Korea, Lithuania, Netherlands, New Zealand, Poland, Portugal, Serbia, Slovakia, Slovenia, Spain, UK, and the United States. Seed treatment uses of clothianidin, corn in particular, have been revoked or suspended in Germany, Italy and Slovenia. The suspensions are reflective of E.U. pesticide law and are generally associated with acute poisoning of bees from pesticide dust being blown off of treated seeds, especially corn, and onto nearby farms where bees were performing pollinator services.

Clothianidin was prequalified for indoor residual spraying by the World Health Organization in 2017.

== Background ==
Although nicotine has been used as a pesticide for over 200 years it degraded too rapidly in the environment and lacked the selectivity to be very useful in large-scale agricultural situations. However, in order to address this problem, the neonicotinoids (chloronicotinyl insecticides) were developed as a substitute of nicotine. Clothianidin is an alternative to organophosphate, carbamate, and pyrethroid pesticides. It poses lower risks to mammals, including humans, when compared to organophosphates and carbamates. It also plays a key role helping to prevent the buildup in insect pests of resistance to organophosphate and pyrethroid pesticides, which is a growing problem in parts of Europe.

Clothianidin was first given registration for use as a pesticide by the Japan Plant Protection Association in 2001. Followed by conditional registration by the United States Environmental Protection Agency in 2003, pending the completion of additional study of its safety to be done by December 2004. Bayer did not complete the study on time and asked for an extension. The date was postponed to May 2005 and they also granted Bayer the permission it had sought to conduct its study on canola in Canada, instead of on maize in the United States. The study was not completed until 2007. In a November 2007 memo EPA scientists declared the study “scientifically sound,” adding that it, “satisfies the guideline requirements for a field toxicity test with honeybees.”

Clothianidin continued to be sold under a conditional registration, and in April 2010 it was granted an unconditional registration for use as a seed treatment for corn and canola. However, in response to concerns raised by bee keepers, in November the EPA released a memorandum in which they stated that some of the studies submitted did not appear to be adequate and the unconditional registration was withdrawn.

== Toxicity ==
Regulatory authorities describe the toxicological database for clothianidin as "extensive", and many studies have been reviewed to support registrations around the globe for this chemical. Laboratory and field testing revealed that clothianidin shows relatively low toxicity to many test species but is highly or very highly toxic to others. Toxicity varies depending on whether the exposure occurs on a short-term (acute) or long-term (chronic) basis.

=== Bees and other insect pollinators ===
Honey bees pollinate crops responsible for about a third of the human diet; about $224 billion worth of crops worldwide. Beginning in 2006, beekeepers in the United States began to report unexplained losses of hives — 30 percent and upward — leading to a phenomenon called colony collapse disorder (CCD). The cause of CCD remains under debate, but scientific consensus is beginning to emerge suggesting that there is no one cause but rather a combination of factors including lack of foraging plants, infections, breeding, and pesticides—with none catastrophic on their own, but having a synergistic effect when occurring in combination.

The Australian Pesticides and Veterinary Medicines Authority notes that clothianidin ranks "among the most highly acutely toxic insecticides to bees" through contact and oral exposure. Since clothianidin is a systemic pesticide that is taken up by the plant, there is also potential for toxic chronic exposure resulting in long-term effects to bees and other pollinators from clothianidin residue in pollen and nectar. According to the Environmental Protection Agency (EPA), in addition to potential effects on worker bees, there are also concerns about lethal and/or sub-lethal effects in the larvae and reproductive effects in the queen from chronic exposure. However, in a 2012 statement the EPA reported that they are not aware of any data demonstrating that bee colonies are subject to elevated losses due to long-term exposure when clothianidin products are used at authorized rates.

Honey bees and other pollinators are particularly sensitive to clothianidin, as evidenced by the results of laboratory and field toxicity testing and demonstrated in acute poisoning incidents in France and Germany in 2008, and in Canada in 2010 and 2013 associated with the planting of corn seeds treated with clothianidin. To reduce the risk to pollinators from acute exposure to clothianidin sprays, label instructions prohibit the use of these products when crops or weeds are in bloom and pollinators are nearby, but in the U.S. label instructions do not require the use of a "sticker", a sticking agent meant to reduce dust from treated seeds during planting. However, according to the EPA, the use of sticking agents to reduce dust from treated seeds is standard practice in the U.S.

In a July 2008 German beekill incident, German beekeepers reported that 50 to 100 percent of their hives had been lost after pneumatic equipment used to plant corn seed blew clouds of pesticide dust into the air, which was then pushed by the wind onto neighboring canola fields in which managed bees were performing pollinator services. The accident was found to be the result of improper planting procedures and the weather. However, in 2009, Germany suspended authorization for the use of clothianidin on corn, citing unanswered questions that remained about potential exposure of bees and other pollinators to neonicotinoid pesticides.

A 2011 Congressional Research Report describing some of the reasons why scientists believe honey bee colonies are being affected by CCD reported that the United States Department of Agriculture had concluded in 2009, "it now seems clear that no single factor alone is responsible for the malady." According to the research report, the neonicotinoids, which contain the active ingredient imidacloprid, and similar other chemicals, such as clothianidin and thiamethoxam, are being studied for a possible link to CCD. Honey bees are thought to possibly be affected by such chemicals, which are known to work their way through the plant up into the flowers and leave residues in the nectar and pollen that bees forage on. The scientists studying CCD have tested samples of pollen and have indicated findings of a broad range of substances, including insecticides, fungicides, and herbicides. They note that the doses taken up by bees are not lethal, but they are concerned about possible chronic problems caused by long-term exposure.

A report released in 2012 found a close relationship between the deaths of bees and the use of pneumatic drilling machines for the sowing of corn seeds coated with clothianidin and other neonicotinoid insecticides. In pneumatic drilling machines, seeds are sucked in, causing the erosion of fragments of the insecticide shell, which are then expelled with a current of air. Field tests found that foraging bees flying through dust released during the planting of corn seeds coated with neonicotinoid insecticides may encounter exposure high enough to be lethal. They concluded: "The consequent acute lethal effect evidenced in all the field sowing experiments can be well compared with the colony loss phenomena widely reported by beekeepers in spring and often associated to corn sowing." Another field study released in 2012 looked at sublethal effects of clothianidin and imidacloprid in amounts that bees might be exposed to during foraging. Sublethal doses can affect orientation, foraging, learning ability and brood care. The study found: "clothianidin elicited detrimental sub-lethal effects at somewhat lower doses (0.5 ng/bee) than imidacloprid (1.5 ng/bee). Bees disappeared at the level of 1 ng for clothianidin, while we could register the first bee losses for imidacloprid at doses exceeding 3 ng."

In a 2012 study, scientists found that an analyses of bees found dead in and around hives from several apiaries in Indiana showed the presence of the neonicotinoid insecticides clothianidin and thiamethoxam. The research showed that the insecticides were present at high concentrations in waste talc that was exhausted from farm machinery during planting and that is left outside after cleaning the planting equipment. Talc is used in the vacuum system planters to keep pesticide treated seeds flowing freely and was studied by the investigators since the waste talc can be picked up by the wind, and could spread the pesticide to non-treated areas; they did not however investigate whether and how much pesticide spreads this way. The insecticides were also consistently found at low levels in soil up to two years after treated seed was planted, and on nearby dandelion flowers and corn pollen gathered by the bees. Also in 2012, researchers in Italy published findings that the pneumatic drilling machines that plant corn seeds coated with clothianidin and imidacloprid release large amounts of the pesticide into the air, causing significant mortality in foraging honey bees.

Studies have shown that milkweed plants contaminated with clothianidin can have a detrimental effect on the development and survival of monarch butterfly caterpillars.

==== Data gaps ====
North American and European pesticide regulatory authorities have identified specific data gaps and uncertainties for which clothianidin manufacturers must provide data. Studies required of the manufacturers will further investigate clothianidin's:

- environmental persistence in soil and subsequent uptake in rotational crops
- availability in pollen and nectar
- long-term effects on honey bees and other pollinators
- developmental immunotoxicity
- effects on aerobic aquatic metabolism
- ability to leach from treated seeds and
- acute toxicity to freshwater invertebrates

The challenges associated with studying potential long-term effects of pesticides on honey bee colonies are well documented and include the inability to adequately monitor individual bee health or extrapolate effects on individuals to whole hives. Behavior changes between bees and/or colonies in laboratory or field test conditions versus natural environments also add to the challenges. Studies submitted by Bayer AG to USEPA have provided some useful information about clothianidin's potential long-term effects on honey bees but outstanding questions remain. USEPA's analysis of nine pollinator field studies submitted concluded that three were invalid, so EPA did not use the data they provided in making its regulatory decision for clothianidin. EPA classified the remainder as supplemental, generally because Bayer AG conducted the studies without EPA first approving the protocols. Supplemental studies are ones that don't definitively answer uncertainties but still provide some data that might be useful in characterizing risk. Indicative of the rapid advance of regulators' understanding of pollinator science, USEPA first accepted one of the studies as sound science in 2007, then reclassified it as invalid in November 2010 only to reclassify it as supplemental one month later. The changes in EPA's classification of this study have no effect on the regulatory status for clothianidin in the U.S. because the study does not provide data with which EPA can legally justify altering its 2003 registration decision. An international group of pesticide regulators, researchers, industry representatives, and beekeepers is working to develop a study protocol that will definitively answer remaining questions about the potential long-term effects on bee colonies and other pollinators.

=== Mammals ===
Clothianidin is moderately toxic in the short-term to mammals that eat it, and long-term ingestion may result in reproductive and/or developmental effects. Using laboratory test animals as surrogates for humans and dosages much higher than are expected from exposure related to actual use, rats showed low short-term oral, dermal, and inhalation toxicity to clothianidin. For mice, acute oral toxicity was moderate to high. Rabbits showed little to no skin or eye irritation when exposed to clothianidin, and the skin of guinea pigs was not sensitized by it. When extrapolated to humans, these results suggest that clothianidin is moderately toxic through oral exposure, but toxicity is low through skin contact or inhalation. While clothianidin may cause slight eye irritation, it is not expected to be a skin sensitizer or irritant. Clothianidin does not damage genetic material nor is there evidence that it causes cancer in rats or mice; it is unlikely to be a human carcinogen.

Permissible amounts of clothianidin residue on food and animal feed vary from crop to crop and nation to nation. However, regulatory authorities around the globe emphasize that when used according to the label instructions, clothianidin residues on food are not expected to exceed safe levels (as defined by each nation's laws and regulations).

=== Aquatic life ===
In the 2003 United States EPA assessment report it was stated that clothianidin should not present a direct acute or chronic risk to freshwater and estuarine/marine fish, or a risk to terrestrial or aquatic vascular and nonvascular plants. It is considered to be toxic to aquatic invertebrates if disposal of wastes according to disposal instructions are not followed. The Pest Management Regulatory Agency of Canada lists it as "very highly toxic" to aquatic invertebrates, but only slightly toxic to fish.

In the 2003 EPA report it was stated that although no water monitoring studies had been conducted, due to the extreme mobility and persistence of clothianidin in the environment, clothianidin has the properties of a chemical which could lead to widespread groundwater contamination should the registrant (e.g. Bayer or Takeda) request field uses involving direct application of clothianidin to the land surface. In a 2010 EPA report, it was noted that the registrant (e.g. Bayer or Takeda) had recently added new uses on the labels, including using the pesticide directly applied to the soil surface/foliage at much higher application rate than as specified in 2003. As a result, the potential for clothianidin to move from the treated area to the nearby surface water body under the new uses is much greater than with use as a seed treatment.

=== Birds ===
According to the EPA, clothianidin is practically non-toxic to test bird species that were fed relatively large doses of the chemical on an acute basis. However, EPA assessments show that exposure to treated seeds through ingestion may result in chronic toxic risk to non-endangered and endangered small birds (e.g., songbirds). Bobwhite quail eggshell thickness was affected when the test birds were given a diet consisting of relatively large amounts of clothianidin-treated seeds. The Pest Management Regulatory Agency of Canada lists clothianidin as "moderately toxic" to birds.

=== Environmental persistence ===
Laboratory and field testing shows that clothianidin is persistent and mobile in the environment, stable to hydrolysis, and has potential to leach to ground water and be transported via runoff to surface water bodies. Worst-case scenario estimates indicate that if applied at the maximum rate repeatedly over years, clothianidin has the potential to accumulate in the top 15 cm of soil. However, the Australian pesticide authority's review of rotational crop studies determined that clothianidin generally is not taken up by crops sown in fields where treated corn seeds were planted, even when the test corn seeds were coated with an intentionally large amount of the chemical (2 mg/seed vs the authorized maximum application rate of 1.25 mg).

=== Risk mitigation ===
Once laboratory and field data identify hazards associated with a chemical, regulatory authorities take different approaches to mitigate those hazards and bring the risks down to acceptable levels, as defined by each nation's laws and regulations. For clothianidin, hazard mitigation includes establishing the maximum amount of the chemical that can be used (e.g. kg/acre or mg/seed), requiring buffer zones around treated fields to protect water supplies, and prohibiting the use of low-technology seed treatment methods or equipment that can send clouds of clothianidin dust or spray up into the air during seeding operations.

Clothianidin users are also required to monitor the weather and not use the chemical or seeds treated with it on windy days or when rain is forecast. Workers are protected from clothianidin exposure through requirements for personal protective equipment, such as long-sleeve shirts, gloves, long pants, boots, and face mask or respirators as appropriate. To reduce the possibility that birds and small mammals might eat treated seeds, users are required to ensure that soil covers planted seeds and that any spilled seed is picked up.

== Regulation ==
=== Neonicotinoids banned by the European Union ===
In 2012, several peer reviewed independent studies were published showing that neonicotinoids, including clothianidin, had previously undetected routes of exposure affecting bees including through dust, pollen, and nectar; that sub-nanogram toxicity resulted in failure to return to the hive without immediate lethality, the primary symptom of colony collapse disorder; and showing environmental persistence in agricultural irrigation channels and soil. These reports prompted a formal peer review by the European Food Safety Authority (EFSA), which stated in January 2013 that neonicotinoids, including clothianidin, pose an unacceptably high risk to bees, and that the industry-sponsored science upon which regulatory agencies' claims of safety have relied on may be flawed and contain several data gaps not previously considered. Their review concluded, "A high acute risk to honey bees was identified from exposure via dust drift for the seed treatment uses in maize, rapeseed oil and cereals. A high acute risk was also identified from exposure via residues in nectar and/or pollen." In April 2013, the European Union voted for a two-year restriction on neonicotinoid insecticides. The ban restricted the use of imidacloprid, clothianidin, and thiamethoxam for use on crops that are attractive to bees (maize, cotton, sunflower, and rapeseed), and goes into effect on December 1, 2013. Eight nations voted against the motion, including the British government which argued that the science was incomplete.

Following on the release of the EFSA report in January 2013, the UK Parliament has asked manufacturer Bayer Cropscience to explain discrepancies in evidence they have submitted to an investigation.

In February 2018, the European Food Safety Authority published a new report indicating that neonicotinoids pose a serious danger to both honey bees and wild bees. In April 2018, the member states of the European Union decided to ban the three main neonicotinoids (clothianidin, imidacloprid and thiamethoxam) for all outdoor uses.

== See also ==
- Bees and toxic chemicals
- Pesticide misuse
- Pesticide toxicity to bees
- Pollinator decline
