= Dinotefuran =

Names
- IUPAC name 2-methyl-1-nitro-3-[(tetrahydro-3-furanyl) methyl] guanidine
- Other names (RS)-1-methyl-2-nitro-3-[(tetrahydro-3-furanyl) methyl] guanidine; MTI-446

Identifiers
CAS Number	165252-70-0
3D model (JSmol)	Interactive image
ChEBI	CHEBI:39183
ChemSpider	171124
ECHA InfoCard	100.111.831
KEGG	C18509
PubChem CID	197701
UNII	1W509710WF
CompTox Dashboard (EPA)	DTXSID7034549
- InChI: InChI=1S/C7H14N4O3/c1-8-7(10-11(12)13)9-4-6-2-3-14-5-6/h6H,2-5H2,1H3,(H2,8,9,10) Key: YKBZOVFACRVRJN-UHFFFAOYSA-N
- SMILES: [O-][N+](=O)NC(=N/C)\NCC1CCOC1

Properties
Chemical formula	C_{7}H_{14}N_{4}O_{3}
Molar mass	202.214 g·mol^{−1}
Melting point	107.5
Solubility in water	39.83 g/L

Hazards
- Lethal dose or concentration (LD, LC)
LD_{50} (median dose)	≥2000 mg/kg (oral, rat and mouse)
- Except where otherwise noted, data are given for materials in their standard state (at 25 °C [77 °F], 100 kPa). verify (what is ?) Infobox references

Dinotefuran is an insecticide of the neonicotinoid class developed by Mitsui Chemicals for control of insect pests such as aphids, whiteflies, thrips, leafhoppers, leafminers, sawflies, mole cricket, white grubs, lacebugs, billbugs, beetles, mealybugs, and cockroaches on leafy vegetables, in residential and commercial buildings, and for professional turf management. Its mechanism of action involves disruption of the insect's nervous system by inhibiting nicotinic acetylcholine receptors.

In July 2013, the US state of Oregon temporarily restricted the use of dinotefuran pending the results of an investigation into a large bee kill.

Dinotefuran is also used in veterinary medicine as a flea and tick preventive for dogs and as a flea preventive for cats. It is used in combination with pyriproxifen and/or permethrin.

== Research ==
Studies show dinotefuran is effective at controlling the invasive spotted lanternfly, first found in Berks County, PA, in 2014.
