= Index of pesticide articles =

This is an index of articles relating to pesticides.

== 0–9 ==
- 1080
- 1080 usage in New Zealand
- 2,4-D
- 2,4-DB

== A ==
- Abamectin
- Acaricide
- Acephate
- Acetochlor
- Acibenzolar
- Acibenzolar-S-methyl
- Acrylonitrile
- Agent blue
- Agent Green
- Agent Orange
- Agent Pink
- Agent Purple
- Agent White
- Agrochemical
- Alachlor
- Aldicarb
- Algaecide
- Allyl isothiocyanate
- Aluminium phosphide
- Aluminium sulfate
- Amdro
- 3-Amino-1,2,4-triazole
- Aminocyclopyrachlor
- Aminopyralid
- Amitraz
- Ammonium sulfamate
- Ant chalk
- Anvil (insecticide)
- Asulam
- ATC code P03
- Atrazine
- Atrazine controversy
- Avicide
- Azinphos-methyl
- Azoxystrobin

== B ==
- Bacillus thuringiensis israelensis
- Bactericide
- Basta (herbicide)
- Bendiocarb
- Bees and toxic chemicals
- Benomyl
- Bensulide
- Benzimidazole fungicide
- Benzoylurea
- Benzyl benzoate
- Bioactive paper
- Biocide
- Bioherbicide
- Biopesticide
- Borax
- Bordeaux mixture
- Brodifacoum
- Bromadiolone
- Bromethalin
- Bromine monochloride
- Bromomethane
- Bromoxynil
- Burgundy mixture

== C ==
- Cacodylic acid
- Calcium phosphide
- Carbendazim
- Captan
- Carbaryl
- Carbofuran
- Chitosan
- Chloralose
- Chloramine-T
- Chlorbenside
- Chlorfenapyr
- Chlorophacinone
- Chlorpyrifos
- Chloropicrin
- Chlorothalonil
- Chlortoluron
- Chromated copper arsenate
- Cinnamaldehyde
- Clofibric acid
- Clomazone
- Clopyralid
- Clothianidin
- Copper pesticide
- Copper(I) cyanide
- Copper(II) arsenate
- Copper(II) sulfate
- Coumatetralyl
- Crimidine
- Cycloheximide
- Cyhalothrin
- Cyromazine

== D ==
- Davicil
- DCMU
- DDT
- DDT in Australia
- DDT in New Zealand
- DDT in the United States
- Dehydroacetic acid
- Deltamethrin
- Diatomaceous earth
- Diazinon
- Dicamba
- Dicarboximide fungicides
- 1,2-Dibromo-3-chloropropane
- 1,2-Dibromoethane
- Dichlofenthion
- 2,6-Dichlorobenzonitrile
- 2,4-Dichlorophenoxyacetic acid
- 1,3-Dichloropropene
- Dichlorprop
- Dichlorvos
- Dicrotophos
- 1,3-Difluoro-2-propanol
- Dimethenamid
- Dinoseb
- Dioxathion
- Diphenylamine
- Diquat
- Disodium methyl arsenate
- Disulfoton
- Dithiopyr
- Dow Chemical Company

== E ==
- Electropositive shark repellent
- Environmental effects of pesticides
- Ethephon
- Ethoprop
- Ethylene fluorohydrine

== F ==
- Falcarinol
- Federal Insecticide, Fungicide, and Rodenticide Act
- Fenamiphos
- Fenoprop
- Fenobucarb
- Fenoxycarb
- Fentin acetate
- Fenvalerate
- Fipronil
- Flit gun
- Fluoroacetamide
- Fluxapyroxad
- Flypaper
- Fly spray
- Fumigation
- Fungicide use in the United States

== G ==
- Global distillation
- Glufosinate
- Glyphosate
- Green pest management

== H ==
- Herbicide
- Herbicidal warfare
- Herbicide safener
- Hexachloroacetone
- Hexachlorobenzene
- Hexachlorophenol
- Hexaconazole
- Hexazinone
- Hydramethylnon
- Hydrogen cyanide

== I ==
- Imazapyr
- Imidacloprid
- Indoor residual spraying
- Indoxacarb
- Insecticide
- Integrated Pest Management
- International HCH and Pesticides Association
- Inter-Regional Research Project Number 4
- Iprodione

== J ==
- Juglone

== K ==
- Kaolin spray

== L ==
- Lampricide
- Larvicide
- Lead hydrogen arsenate
- Light brown apple moth controversy
- Lime sulfur
- Limonene
- Loline alkaloids
- Lufenuron
- Lumax

== M ==
- Maintenance fees (EPA)
- Malathion
- MCPA
- MCPB
- Metalaxyl
- Metaldehyde
- Metepa
- Metham sodium
- Methazole
- Methiocarb
- Methomyl
- Methoprene
- Metrifonate
- Metsulfuron-methyl
- Methylisothiazolone
- Metolachlor
- Milbemycin
- Milbemycin oxime
- Miticide
- Mode of action
- Molluscicide
- Monosodium methyl arsenate
- Monsanto
- Mothball
- MPP^{+}
- Myclobutanil
- Mycoherbicide

== N ==
- N-Octyl bicycloheptene dicarboximide
- Naphthalene
- Alpha-Naphthylthiourea
- Nematicide
- Neonicotinoid
- Nitisinone
- Non-pesticide management
- Norbormide

== P ==
- Paradox of the pesticides
- Paraquat
- Paris Green
- Pendimethalin
- Pentachloronitrobenzene
- Pentachlorophenol
- Permethrin
- Persistent organic pollutant
- Pest control
- The Pesticide Question
- Pesticide application
- Pesticide degradation
- Pesticide detection kit
- Pesticide drift
- Pesticide formulation
- Pesticides in Canada
- Pesticides in New Zealand
- Pesticides in the United States
- Pesticide misuse
- Pesticide poisoning
- Pesticide residue
- Pesticide research
- Pesticide resistance
- Pesticide toxicity to bees
- Picloram
- Piperonyl butoxide
- Pindone
- Pirimiphos-methyl
- Piscicide
- Phenoxy herbicide
- 2-Phenylphenol
- Phenylsilatrane
- 4-Phenylthiosemicarbazide
- Phosacetim
- Phosphine
- DL-Phosphinothricin
- Phytotoxicity
- Possible carcinogen
- Potassium bromide
- Preemergent herbicides
- Pirimicarb
- Procymidone
- Prometon
- Propanil
- Propiconazole
- Pydiflumetofen
- Pyrimethanil
- Pyrinuron
- Pyriproxyfen

== Q ==
- QoI

== R ==
- Ramrod (herbicide)
- Restricted use pesticide
- Roach bait
- Rodenticide
- Roundup

== S ==
- Scheele's Green
- Scilliroside
- Sedaxane
- Sentricon
- Sesamex
- Shark repellent
- Sheep dip
- Silent Spring
- Simazine
- Sodium fluoroacetate
- Spinosad
- Strobilurin
- Sulfentrazone

== T ==
- Tebuconazole
- Tebufenpyrad
- Tefluthrin
- Tempo 20 wp
- Tephrosin
- Terbuthylazine
- Tetramethylenedisulfotetramine
- TFM (piscicide)
- Thiram (fungicide)
- Thujaplicins
- Tiabendazole
- Toxicity Class
- Tributyltin
- Tributyltin oxide
- Triclocarban
- 2,4,5-Trichlorophenoxyacetic acid
- Triclopyr
- Trifluralin
- Triazofos
- Trophobiosis

== U ==
- Ultra-low volume
- Uragan D2
- UK Pesticides Campaign

== V ==
- Veracevine
- Vinclozolin
- Virucide

== W, X, Y, Z ==
- Warfarin
- Xanthene
- Xanthone
- Zyklon B
- Zinc phosphide
- Zineb

== See also ==
- List of fungicides
- List of herbicides
- List of insecticides
