= Light brown apple moth controversy =

2007 pesticide use in the US

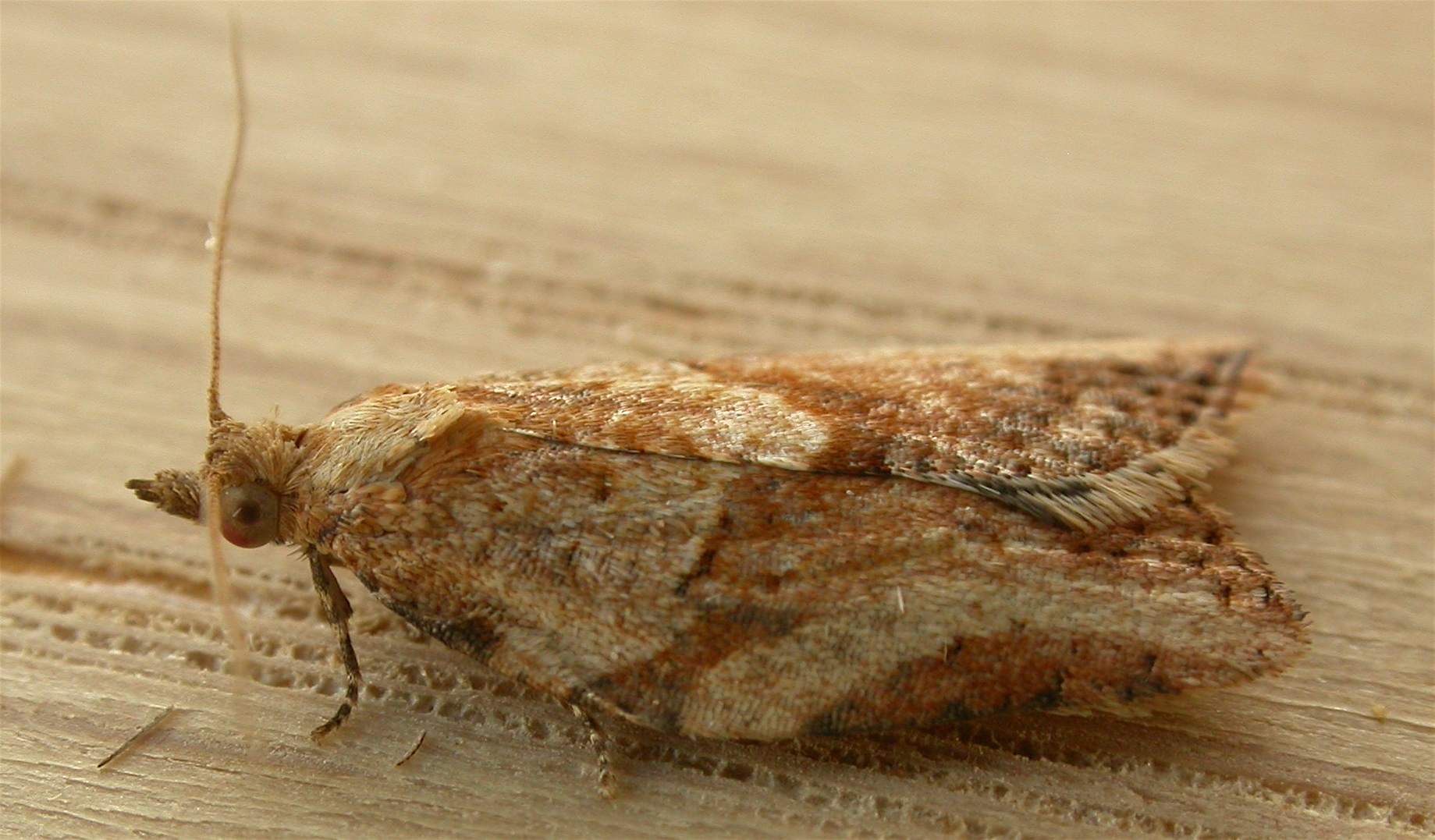

The light brown apple moth (Epiphyas postvittana, often abbreviated to LBAM) is a leafroller moth belonging to the lepidopteran family Tortricidae. The moth was confirmed to be present in mainland United States in 2007, principally along the West Coast. The State of California and the US Department of Agriculture quickly imposed agricultural quarantine measures and decided to use aerial spraying to try to eradicate the moth. This led to substantial public controversy and claims of adverse health effects. Aerial spraying was discontinued in 2008. Trapping, monitoring, and inspection efforts were reduced or eliminated in 2012 due to budget problems.

== Light brown apple moth ==
The insect is regarded as an herbivorous generalist, and the larvae consume numerous plant crops in Australia and New Zealand. The species is native to Australia and is found in New Zealand, Ireland, the United Kingdom, and Hawaii.

The moth has been classified as a noxious insect in the United States and Canada, but not in Europe. This resulted in restrictions on importing and exporting produce from infested areas between the US, Mexico, and Canada under the North American Free Trade Agreement.

== History ==
The first light brown apple moth to be confirmed in California by DNA analysis was found in February 2007. James Carey, a professor of entomology at the University of California-Davis, believes, based on his previous experience with the gypsy moth program and its geographic spread at the time of identification, that the light brown apple moth had likely been in California for many years before that.

In early 2007, the state decided to eradicate the moth. This decision may have been prompted in part by quarantine measures imposed by Canada and Mexico on California's produce. At the time, some experts thought that eradication was feasible, and others did not. The potential losses related to lost and damaged crops, if the moth spread unchecked throughout the state, was estimated to be above US $600 million ($930 million after adjusting for inflation).

The California Department of Food and Agriculture issued a State Interior Quarantine order restricting intrastate shipment of plant material from counties where LBAM had been found. The US Animal and Plant Health Inspection Service later issued a Federal Domestic Quarantine order on May 2, 2007, with restrictions on interstate shipment of plant material. CDFA officials, together with the United States Department of Agriculture and the United States Environmental Protection Agency, initiated what they described as an emergency eradication program, including domestic and international quarantines and inspection programs. Although a pesticide cannot be legally used if it has not been registered by EPA's Office of Pesticide Programs in accordance with the Federal Insecticide, Fungicide, and Rodenticide Act (FIFRA), the EPA has the ability to approve emergency exemptions (under Section 18 of FIFRA) for unregistered uses of pesticides for limited time periods, if the EPA determines that emergency conditions exist and the request meets EPA safety requirements. The EPA granted the quarantine exemption request from the USDA.

The amount of active ingredient applied was less than one ounce per acre (about one-eighth of a drop per square meter). The Monterey County Weekly, in October 2007, reported that according to CDFA spokesman Jay Van Rein, the first two aerial applications over the Monterey Peninsula cost $3.7 million, with $3.1 million of that used to buy the spray products. The November 2007 application was described as costing $2.7 million.

In 2012, during a budget crunch, the state cut funding for the pest control program, including for agricultural inspections.

== Eradication measures ==
In late 2007, the California moth eradication program controversially included aerial spraying of a product containing sex pheromones that attract LBAM males over sixty square miles near the Pacific coast between Monterey and Santa Cruz. The US Environmental Protection Agency authorized the aerial spraying of the pheromone spray every 30 days until 2010. The ingredients of LBAM-F were published on the CDFA website in 2007. In June 2008, the State of California announced that it was abandoning plans for aerial spraying over population centers.

In December 2015, a California appeals court ruled against the LBAM pesticide program on the grounds that it violated state environmental laws by not sufficiently considering less harmful alternatives.

=== Adverse health claims ===
After the spraying in Monterey and Santa Cruz counties in the fall of 2007, 453 complaints of adverse health effects in humans were reported. An analysis of all of these reports was published by the state Office of Environmental Health Hazard Assessment (OEHHA) in April 2008. Most of these were self-reports posted on websites; 44 (10%) were reports from healthcare providers. More than half of the reports were from residents of Monterey County. Less than 25% of the reports included the date and place, and almost none of the complaints posted on websites contained all of the information needed to evaluate the complaint. The report said "Our most significant conclusion is that we were unable to link the reported symptoms with exposure to the pheromone formulation".

Of the 74 people who said they sought medical assistance, most reported asthma exacerbations or non-specific respiratory symptoms such as cough, shortness of breath, runny nose, or wheezing. The symptoms reported, such as irritated eyes, wheezing, or headaches, were similar to those experienced by 15–25% of adults in California each week. The rate of reported symptoms was 0.12% of people per application (less than one-hundredth the normal rate). Since the reported symptoms are very common, it was impossible to determine whether any individual's symptoms were related to the spray.

Critics such as Assemblymember John Laird were disappointed by the report.

== Efficacy debate and proposed solutions ==
Critics state that no published efficacy reports on the pheromone formulations used aerially against LBAM exist, raising questions about the validity of the eradication effort. Additionally, University of California scientists and other independent experts recommend containment measures in urban areas, reserving full-scale airplane spraying for crop areas in the Central Valley. Oakland city council member Jane Brunner questioned the location of the sprayings in interviews and in her resolution against the efforts.

The group 'Helping Our Peninsula's Environment' proposes controlling the moth with the targeted use of pheromone-baited sticky traps. These are the same traps used for population size measuring purposes. The traps have caught and killed almost all the 27,000 LBAM moths found so far in California. This method would employ four additional traps for every LBAM caught and consumes far less resources in traps and staff than applying 160,000 twist ties per square mile (250 per acre).

Other critics of the aerial spray plan, such as The California Nevada Regional Conservation Committee of the Sierra Club, propose that twist ties be impregnated with the pheromone and hung on trees and other structures across the area. They say they prefer least-toxic, environmentally sensitive control methods to spraying.

The California Department of Food and Agriculture has determined that more than nine million twist ties would be required to cover the infested area. Because the twist ties need to be placed at optimal distances from each other, one trained employee can correctly place 30 to 40 twist ties in a single day. Twist ties become ineffective after about three months and then need to be removed, disposed of, and replaced four times a year. As a result, using twist ties as the primary measure to control the moth has been ruled out. In early February 2008, the California Department of Food and Agriculture and the U.S. Department of Agriculture (USDA) announced that treatment using pheromone-infused twist ties was scheduled for LBAM eradication in some lightly infested areas. A USDA official has stated that they are still considering whether to treat San Francisco and the East Bay Area through ground or aerial application.

In March 2008, Fairfax, California City Councilmember Larry Bragman wrote an article stating that since no biological basis for the spraying appears to exist, the more likely issue appears to be the costly trade quarantines invoked by Mexico and Canada under the North American Free Trade Agreement (NAFTA). But he also cited an excerpt from the Mexican quarantine demand: "The present phytosanitary conditions may be modified or harmonized whenever we have more technical and scientific information regarding E. postvittana (LBAM) as well as we receive more information about the evolution status of this pest in the United States."

Bragman, like others, notes that the moth is not a quarantine pest in Europe, and pointed to the recent research papers by Harder and Carey that he believes constitute technical and scientific information which should be conveyed to trade representatives.

Several county public health officials posted public letters expressing their concerns or disagreements with the spray program. Health Officer of the Public Health Division of the County of Santa Cruz, Poki Stewart Namkung, stated in a letter on March 18, 2008, to Santa Cruz Assemblymember Laird, that "We do not believe that any spraying should commence before completion of an EIR that includes a comprehensive human health assessment."

Alameda County Public Health Director, Athony Iton, along with Alameda County Supervisor Keith Carson, stated in a letter on February 26, 2008, to the CDFA, that "We are confident that there are a variety of other methods to address the LBAM that are much safer for people and the environment and do not pose a major health risk to the residents of Alameda County and California."

On April 9, 2008, California Congressmember Sam Farr (D-Carmel) further inquired at an agriculture hearing in Washington D.C. about how and when the light brown apple moth was blacklisted and whether it should be declassified from that status. News stories about the inquiry quoted Farr as saying: "If we don’t even know why the moth is listed as a dangerous pest, it’s impossible to determine how far we must go to control it or whether the current emergency eradication tactics are justified."

In December 2013, James Carey and Daniel Harder published an article criticizing the way expert panels are structured, because they permit scientists involved in a decision-making process to have private discussions and do not generally release information about internal disagreements to the public.

== Legal challenges, public outcry and investigations ==
By June 2008, over 30 California city councils including San Francisco, Monterey, Pacific Grove, Seaside, Santa Cruz, Oakland, Albany and Berkeley had passed resolutions against the spray and over 80 environmental, health and political groups were on record opposing it. In February 2008, several legislative bills based on citizen concerns about aerial spraying in urban areas and the ability of state agencies to declare a state of emergency were drafted by state legislators. On March 13, 2008, Assemblyman John Laird, D-Santa Cruz, introduced Assembly Concurrent Resolution 117, calling on the Departments of Food and Agriculture and Pesticide Regulation, the Office of Environmental Health Hazard Assessment and other state agencies to answer unresolved questions. He stated, "It is the responsibility of our government to demonstrate its LBAM actions are necessary and do not compromise human or environmental health,” Laird said. “It isn’t the responsibility of the people to demonstrate the reverse." The resolution uses a fast track process in the state House and Senate which does not require the Governor's signature. Laird's Invasive Pest Planning Act of 2008, AB 2763, passed the Assembly Environmental Safety and Toxic Materials Committee by a vote of 4–0 on April 2 of 2008. On March 22, 2008, San Francisco Mayor Gavin Newsom wrote a public letter to the Governor urging him to study health consequences before continuing with the spray campaign. He cited relevant state legislation and asked the governor to sign the bills into law immediately.

In order to conduct the spraying, the U.S. Department of Agriculture (not the state agency) was able to obtain an "emergency exemption from registration" from the U.S. EPA. Representatives of the California Department of Pesticide Regulation say that because of that exemption, the spraying program is not subject to state approval. But Santa Cruz city Attorney John Barisone has said that the moth "isn't an emergency. We've known about it for quite a while." The legal brief he is involved in argues that the state first knew, in 1995, that the moth was "highly likely" to establish itself in the United States, but that no environmental studies were done on how best to deal the moth, resulting in the spray plan and consequent panic among residents fearful of spray effects.

In March 2008, an Associated Press investigation into the decision to award a $497,000 no-bid contract to Porter Novelli, a public relations firm tasked to promote the spraying program, described e-mails obtained by AP as indicating that a senior state contracting official questioned the contract award. The e-mails, obtained through a California Public Records Act request, also showed that a senior counsel with the California Department of General Services questioned the rationale for a no-bid contract, and admitted that he had never before been asked to approve a no-bid contract for public affairs work. The investigation also focused on an expected winner in the contract, naming Jeff Randle, a frequent campaign and political adviser to Arnold Schwarzenegger, as being promised by state officials to receive a share of the work. Randle was a campaign consultant involved in the scandal that drove disgraced state Insurance Commissioner Chuck Quackenbush from office, and was hired as a consultant for Schwarzenegger's gubernatorial campaign in 2003. A CDFA spokesperson said that U.S. Department of Agriculture would be reimbursing the state of California for much of the cost of the $497,000 PR firm contract, but could not provide any details. One day after the Associated Press published the story behind the contract, the deal was suspended.

Another contract questioned by some has been the contract for the aerial dispersal of the pheromone, given to Dynamic Aviation, an experienced Virginia aerial application company that also has government contracts with the Defense Department and Homeland Security, among others.

In an article for The California Progressive Report, the Mayor of Albany, California, Robert Lieber, RN, called for the resignation of CDFA Secretary Kawamura, citing his three main concerns: that the pheromone has not been tested for long-term human exposure risk, that the inert ingredients are toxic and carcinogenic, and that U.C. Davis scientists examining the microcapsules found that "some particles are small enough to be inhaled into the deep lung where they cannot be expelled." He described the conduct of Secretary Kawamura as a "disgraceful public deception campaign."

On September 24, 2007 Helping Our Peninsula's Environment (HOPE) filed the first suit alleging CDFA had violated California's Environmental Quality Act (CEQA) by falsely claiming their aerial spraying program was exempt from CEQA due to an emergency. A little more than one month later the County and City of Santa Cruz filed an essentially identical lawsuit.

On April 24, 2008, Santa Cruz County won their California Environmental Quality Act (CEQA) lawsuit against CDFA halting any spraying in that county until an Environmental Impapct Report (EIR) is completed. On May 8 CDFA's attorney Anita Ruud told Monterey County Judge O'Farrell the EIR is expected to be complete in January 2009. In 2008 CDFA suspended aerial spraying during the rainy season until late spring indicating that aerial spraying in Santa Cruz County should not resume until late spring 2009.

In response to Judge Burdick's question CDFA's attorney Bill Jenkins admitted that LBAM had done "no documented damage" to California agriculture or ecosystems. The county attorney Jason Heath cited documentation that some federal officials themselves did not consider the moth to be a serious threat, but instead described it as a "transient pest" and cited "largely untested strategies."

At the end of the hearing the Judge ruled that CDFA had abused their discretion and violated California's Environmental Quality Act when they illegally exempted their aerial spraying program from CEQA claiming the LBAM discovery in California was an emergency. Judge Burdick did not find any evidence that the arrival of the light brown apple moth in California constitutes the claimed emergency. He ordered CDFA to halt the spraying program and rescind their exemption from CEQA until an Environmental Impapct Report is completed.

Just an hour later, following a meeting with State Senator Carole Migden and Marin County officials, Governor Schwarzenegger announced that the state will postpone the spray program until some tests for acute toxicity of the sprays are completed expected on August 17, 2008.

On May 12, 2008, Monterey County Superior Court Judge Robert A. O'Farrell reached a similar conclusion in an identical Monterey CEQA case brought on September 24, 2007 by Helping Our Peninsula's Environment (HOPE).

O'Farrell halted the program of aerial spraying of Monterey peninsula communities until an Environmental Impact Report is prepared. The judge ruled that CDFA had illegally exempted themselves from the California Environmental Quality Act because there was no "substantial evidence" of significant damage by the LBA moth.

On June 18, 2008 CDFA filed Notices of Appeal for both of the CEQA lawsuits they had lost. (The following day CDFA announced the abandonment of aerial spraying over populated areas. It is not known whether CDFA will pursue the appeals.)

In December 2013, Drs. James Carey and Daniel Harder published a paper titled, "Clear, Present, Significant, & Imminent Danger: Questions for the California Light Brown Apple Moth (Epiphyas postvittana) Technical Working Group," in the journal, American Entomologist. The study calls into question the role of scientists in the decision-making that led to the aerial spray.

On December 2, 2015, in a case against the CDFA by several groups, including Earth Justice, the California Environmental Health Initiative, Pesticide Action Network, and others, the Third District Court of Appeals ruled against the LBAM pesticide program on the grounds that it violated state environmental laws.

== State legislation ==
On April 16, the Assembly Agriculture Committee passed two pieces of legislation: ACR 117 and AB 2763.

ACR 117 is an Assembly Concurrent Resolution that calls on the California Department of Food and Agriculture, the Department of Pesticide Regulation, the Office of Environmental Health Hazard Assessment and other relevant state departments to address unresolved health, scientific and efficacy issues involving the eradication plans. The resolution passed 5–3 and next goes to the Assembly Appropriations Committee.

AB 2763, the Invasive Pest Planning Act of 2008 – would require the CDFA to create a list of invasive animals, plants, and insects that have a reasonable likelihood of entering California for which an eradication program might be appropriate.

== See also ==
- Aerial application
- Mating disruption
- Non-pesticide management
- Pesticide
- Pesticide application
- Pesticide drift
- Pesticide misuse
- Pesticide poisoning
