= Ramrod (disambiguation) =

A ramrod is a device used with early firearms to push the projectile up against the propellant (mainly gunpowder).

Ramrod may also refer to:

== Arts and entertainment ==
=== Clubs ===
- Ramrod (New York City), a former gay club

=== Films ===
- Ramrod (film), a 1947 Western film

=== Fictional characters ===
- Patrick Mahony, a mutant in the Marvel Universe and member of the Nasty Boys (comics), also known as Ramrod
- Ramrod (Marvel Comics), a fictional villain in the Marvel Universe
- Ramrod, a robot and the transforming space ship in Saber Rider and the Star Sheriffs
- Ramrod, a fictional Los Angeles based pimp in Vice Squad (1982 film)

=== Music ===
- The Ramrods (instrumental group), an American group who had a hit in 1961 with "(Ghost) Riders in the Sky"
- The Ramrods (punk band), a punk rock band from Detroit in the late 1970s
- Ramrod (EP), an EP by Scraping Foetus Off the Wheel
- "Ramrod" (Duane Eddy song), a 1958 song by Duane Eddy, from the album Have 'Twangy' Guitar Will Travel
- "Ramrod" (Bruce Springsteen song), a 1980 song by Bruce Springsteen, from the album The River

== Military ==
- Ramrod, a type of bombing mission carried out by Royal Air Force in WWII
  - Operation Ramrod 16, an RAF bombing mission in 1943
- "Ramrods", nickname for the 2nd Battalion of the 2nd Infantry Regiment of the United States Army
- Forward Operating Base Sarkari Karez, a foreign military base in Maywand District, Kandahar Province, Afghanistan during the War in Afghanistan (named by the 2nd Battalion, 2nd Infantry "Ramrods" in 2008)

== Other uses ==
- Ramrod Herbicide, an early herbicide created by Monsanto in 1964
- RAMROD (Ride Around Mount Rainier in One Day), an annual bicycle ride sponsored by the Redmond Bicycle Club in Washington State
- Ram Rod, a nickname for Grateful Dead "head roadie" and corporate president Laurence Shurtliff (1947–2006)
