= Pesticides in the United States =

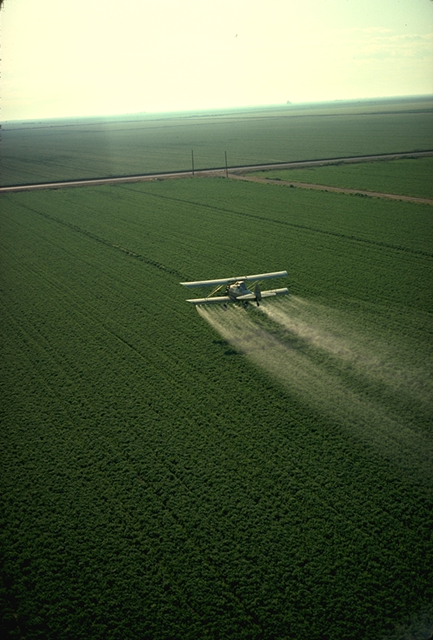
A plane flying over a field in California, when spraying crops like this there is a chance of pesticide drift, which can affect neighboring towns and residents with adverse reactions.

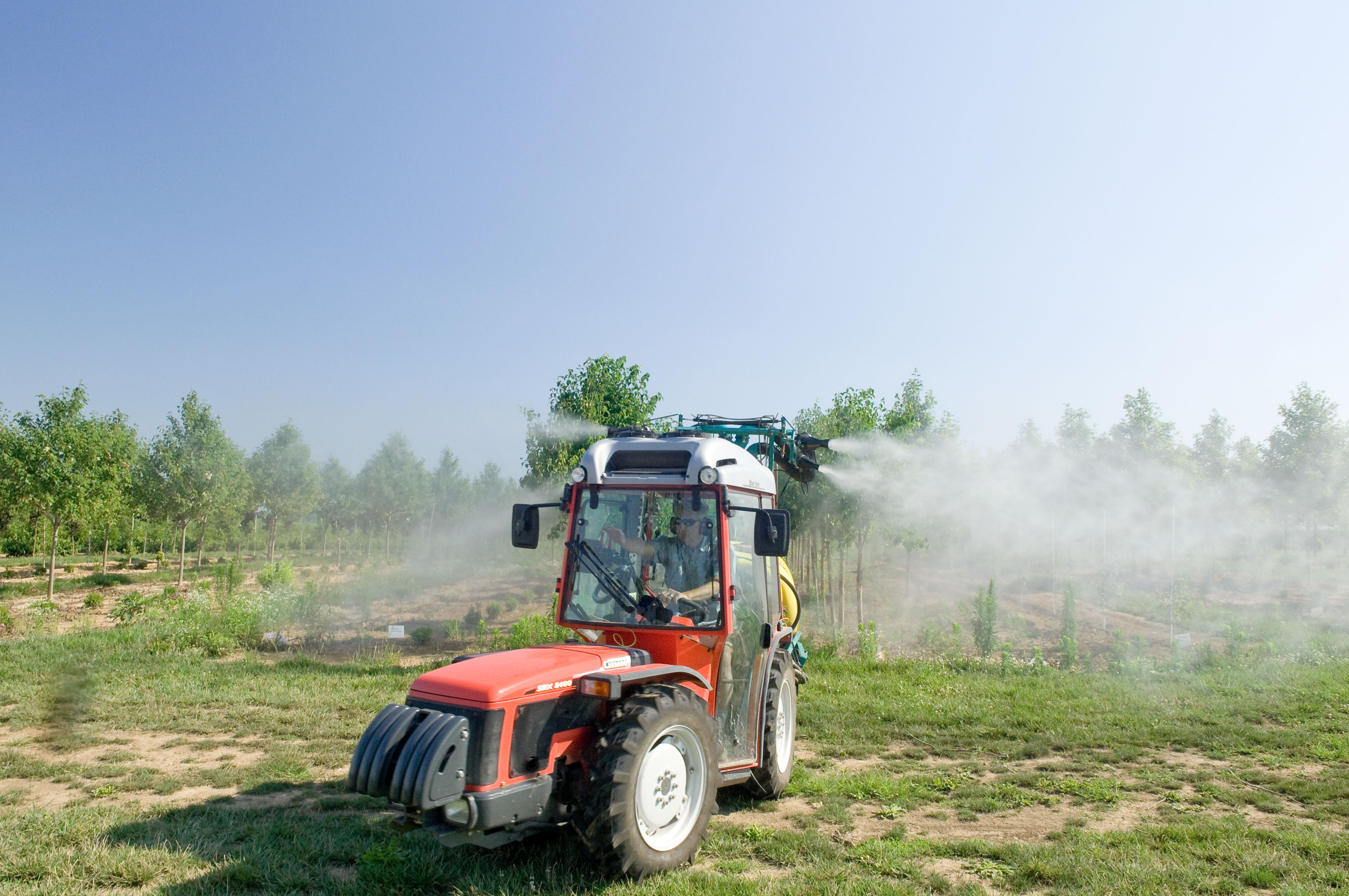
Tractor spraying pesticides, 2008

Pesticides in the United States are used predominantly by the agricultural sector, but approximately a quarter of them are used in houses, yards, parks, golf courses, and swimming pools.

== Use ==
=== Atrazine ===
Atrazine is the second-most commonly used herbicide in the United States after glyphosate, with application of approximately 76,000,000 pounds (34,000 t) of the active ingredient in 1997. It is inexpensive and very low acute toxicity to humans.

The U.S. EPA said in the 2003 Interim Reregistration Eligibility Decision, "The total or national economic impact resulting from the loss of atrazine to control grass and broadleaf weeds in corn, sorghum and sugarcane would be in excess of $2 billion per year if atrazine were unavailable to growers." In the same report, it added the "yield loss plus increased herbicide cost may result in an average estimated loss of $28 per acre" if atrazine were unavailable to corn farmers.

In 2006, the EPA concluded that the triazine herbicides posed "no harm that would result to the general U.S. population, infants, children or other... consumers."

EPA concluded, in 2007, that atrazine does not adversely affect amphibian gonadal development based on a review of laboratory and field studies, including studies submitted by the registrant and studies published in the scientific literature.

A 2010 study, conducted by the U.S. Geological Survey, observed substantial adverse reproductive effects on fish from atrazine exposure at concentrations below the USEPA water-quality guideline.

=== DDT ===
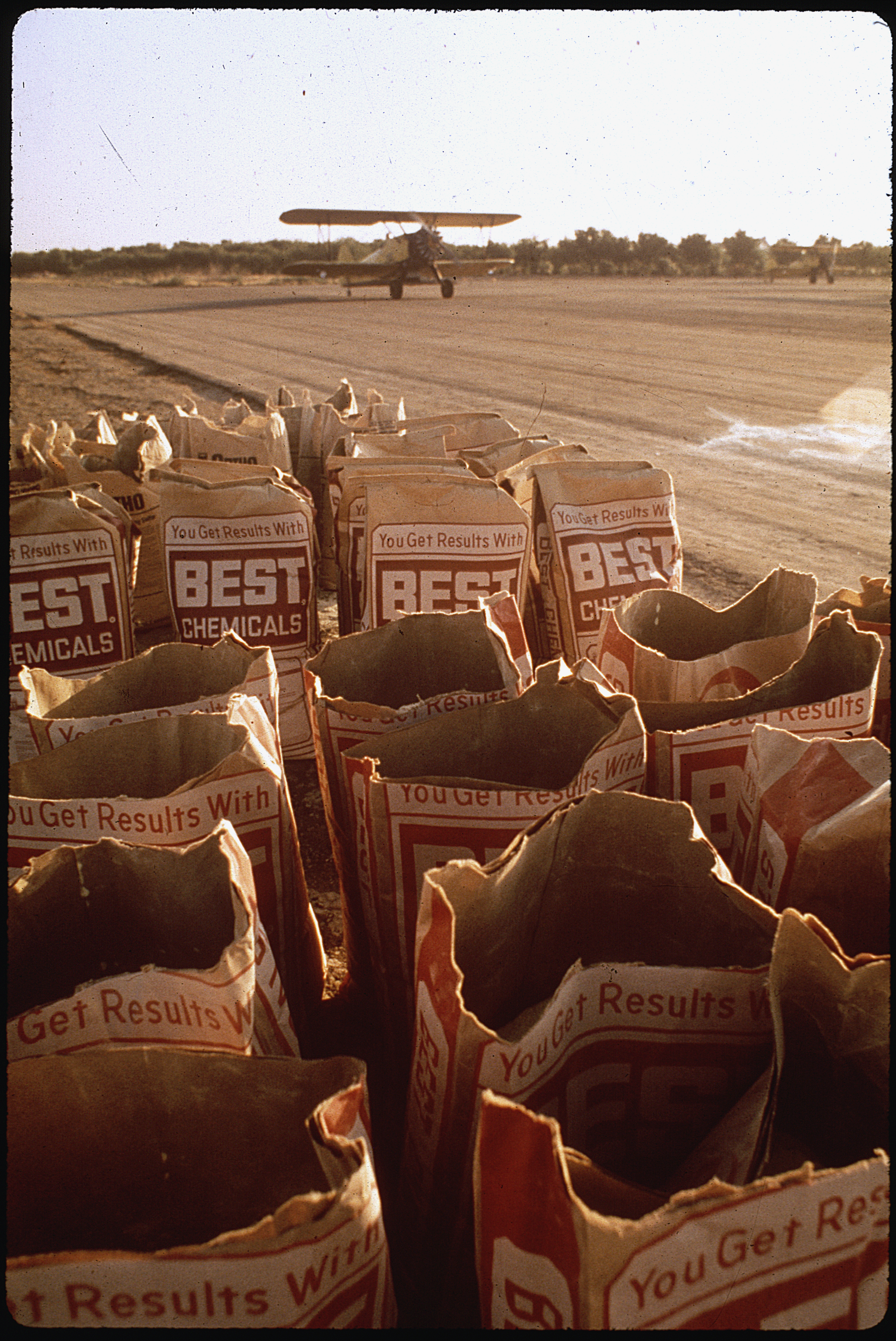
Pesticide bags in Fresno, California during May 1972 read 'You get results with Best Chemicals'.

The use of DDT in the United States was banned in 1972, except for a limited exemption for public health uses. Public concern about the usage of DDT was largely influenced by the book, Silent Spring, written by Rachel Carson. The ban on DDT is cited by scientists as a major factor in the comeback of the bald eagle in the continental United States.

== Regulation ==
The Federal Insecticide, Fungicide, and Rodenticide Act (FIFRA) was first passed in 1947, giving the United States Department of Agriculture responsibility for regulating pesticides. In 1972, FIFRA underwent a major revision and transferred responsibility of pesticide regulation to the Environmental Protection Agency and shifted emphasis to protection of the environment and public health.

== Issues ==
Pesticides were found to pollute every stream and more than 90% of wells sampled in a 2007 study by the US Geological Survey. Pesticide residues have also been found in rain and groundwater.

United States agricultural workers experience 10,000 cases or more of physician-diagnosed pesticide poisoning annually.

The National Academy of Sciences estimates that between 4,000 and 20,000 cases of cancer are caused per year by the allowed amounts of pesticide residues in food.

In California, counties with a majority Latino population use 906% more pesticides (at 2,373 pounds per square mile and 22 pounds per person) than counties in which the Latino population is fewer than 24% (at 262 pounds per square mile and 2.4 pounds per person).

=== Effects on biota ===
==== Resistance ====
Pesticide resistance has evolved in insect and plant populations in the United States. Some insects and plants have evolved resistance to multiple pesticides.

==== Birds ====
The USDA and USFWS estimate that more than 67 million birds are killed by pesticides each year in the U.S.

==== Fish ====
The United States Department of Agriculture and the United States Fish and Wildlife Service estimate that between 6 and 14 million fish are killed by pesticides each year in the U.S.

==== Amphibians ====
U.S. scientists have found that some pesticides used in farming disrupt the nervous systems of frogs, and that use of these pesticides is correlated with a decline in the population of frogs in the Sierra Nevada.

Some scientists believe that certain common pesticides already exist at levels capable of killing amphibians in California. They warn that the breakdown products of these pesticides may be 10 to 100 times more toxic to amphibians than the original pesticides. Direct contact of sprays of some pesticides (either by drift from nearby applications or accidental or deliberate sprays) may be highly lethal to amphibians.

Being downwind from agricultural land on which pesticides are used has been linked to the decline in population of threatened frog species in California.

In Minnesota, pesticide use has been linked causally to congenital deformities in frogs such as eye, mouth, and limb malformations. Researchers in California found that similar deformities in frogs in the U.S. and Canada may have been caused by breakdown products from pesticides whose use is categorized as not posing a threat.

=== Pesticide residue in food ===
The Pesticide Data Program, a program started by the United States Department of Agriculture is the largest tester of pesticide residues on food sold in the United States. It began in 1991 and tests food for the presence of various pesticides and if they exceed EPA tolerance levels for samples collected close to the point of consumption. Their most recent summary results are from the 2016 where more than 99% of samples were well below EPA tolerance levels. Tolerance violations were detected in 0.46 percent samples tested out of 10,365 samples. Of the 48 samples, 26 were domestic, 20 were of foreign origin, and 2 were of unknown origin.

== See also ==
- National Pesticide Information Center
- Chitosan (Natural Biocontrol for Agricultural & Horticultural use)
- Environmental issues in the United States
- Environment of the United States
- Fungicide use in the United States
- Light brown apple moth controversy
