= C11H14ClNO =

The molecular formula C_{11}H_{14}ClNO may refer to:

- 4-Cl-3-MMC (4-chloro-3-methylmethcathinone)
- 4-Chloroethcathinone
- 3-Chlorophenmetrazine
- Propachlor
