= Maintenance fee =

Maintenance fee may refer to:

- Maintenance, repair, and operations, fees paid by tenants for the upkeep of the building
- A fee to be paid to maintain a patent or patent application into force, see maintenance fee (patent)
- A management fee, see mutual fund
- Maintenance fee (EPA), the annual fees paid by pesticide manufacturers and formulators to continue registration of pesticide active ingredients and products with the Environmental Protection Agency
