= The Ramrods =

The Ramrods may refer to:

- The Ramrods (instrumental group) from Connecticut in the late 1950s and 1960s who had a hit with "(Ghost) Riders in the Sky"
- The Ramrods (punk band) from Detroit in the late 1970s
