= Chlorbenside =

Names
- Preferred IUPAC name 1-Chloro-4-{[(4-chlorophenyl)methyl]sulfanyl}benzene
- Other names (4-Chlorobenzyl)(4-chlorophenyl)sulfane

Identifiers
CAS Number	103-17-3
3D model (JSmol)	Interactive image
ChemSpider	7357
ECHA InfoCard	100.002.805
PubChem CID	7639
UNII	FLR6R453DD
CompTox Dashboard (EPA)	DTXSID1041766
- InChI: InChI=1S/C13H10Cl2S/c14-11-3-1-10(2-4-11)9-16-13-7-5-12(15)6-8-13/h1-8H,9H2 Key: ZHLKXBJTJHRTTE-UHFFFAOYSA-N; InChI=1/C13H10Cl2S/c14-11-3-1-10(2-4-11)9-16-13-7-5-12(15)6-8-13/h1-8H,9H2 Key: ZHLKXBJTJHRTTE-UHFFFAOYAX
- SMILES: ClC1=CC=C(SCC2=CC=C(Cl)C=C2)C=C1

Properties
Chemical formula	C_{13}H_{10}Cl_{2}S
Molar mass	269.18 g·mol^{−1}
- Except where otherwise noted, data are given for materials in their standard state (at 25 °C [77 °F], 100 kPa). verify (what is ?) Infobox references

Chlorbenside (C_{13}H_{10}Cl_{2}S), also known as chlorparaside and chlorsulfacide, is a pesticide. It is used as an acaricide being used to kill mites and ticks.
