= The Pesticide Question =

1993 book edited by David Pimentel and Hugh Lehman

The Pesticide Question: Environment, Economics, and Ethics
- Author: David Pimentel, Hugh Lehman
- Language: English
- Publisher: Springer
- Publication date: 1993
- Pages: 441 pages
- ISBN: 978-0-412-03581-4
- OCLC: 25748386
- Dewey Decimal: 363.17/92 20
- LC Class: QH545.P4 P4793 1993

The Pesticide Question: Environment, Economics and Ethics is a 1993 book edited by David Pimentel and Hugh Lehman. Use of pesticides has improved agricultural productivity, but there are also concerns about safety, health and the environment.

This book is the result of research by leading scientists and policy experts into the non-technical and social issues of pesticides. In examining the social policies related to pesticides use, they consider the costs as well as the benefits. The book says that Intensive farming cannot completely do without synthetic chemicals, but that it is technologically possible to reduce the amount of pesticides used in the United States by 35-50 per cent without reducing crop yields. The researchers show that to regain public trust, those who regulate and use pesticides must examine fair ethical questions and take appropriate action to protect public welfare, health, and the environment. Anyone concerned with reducing our reliance on chemical pesticides and how human activities can remain both productive and environmentally sound will find this volume a stimulating contribution to a troubling debate.

The Pesticide Question builds on the 1962 best seller book Silent Spring by Rachel Carson. Carson did not reject the use of pesticides, but argued that their use was often indiscriminate and resulted in harm to people and the environment. She also highlighted the problem of pests becoming resistant to pesticides.

Carson's work is referred to many times in The Pesticide Question, which critically explores many non-technical issues associated with pesticide use, mainly in the United States. The book has 40 contributors, mainly academics from a wide range of disciplines. The Pesticide Question is divided into five main parts:

- social and environmental effects of pesticides;
- methods and effects of reducing pesticide use;
- government policy and pesticide use;
- history, public attitudes, and ethics in regard to pesticide use; and
- the benefits and risks of pesticides.
