= Harsh Vardhan Batra =

Indian scientist (born 1955)

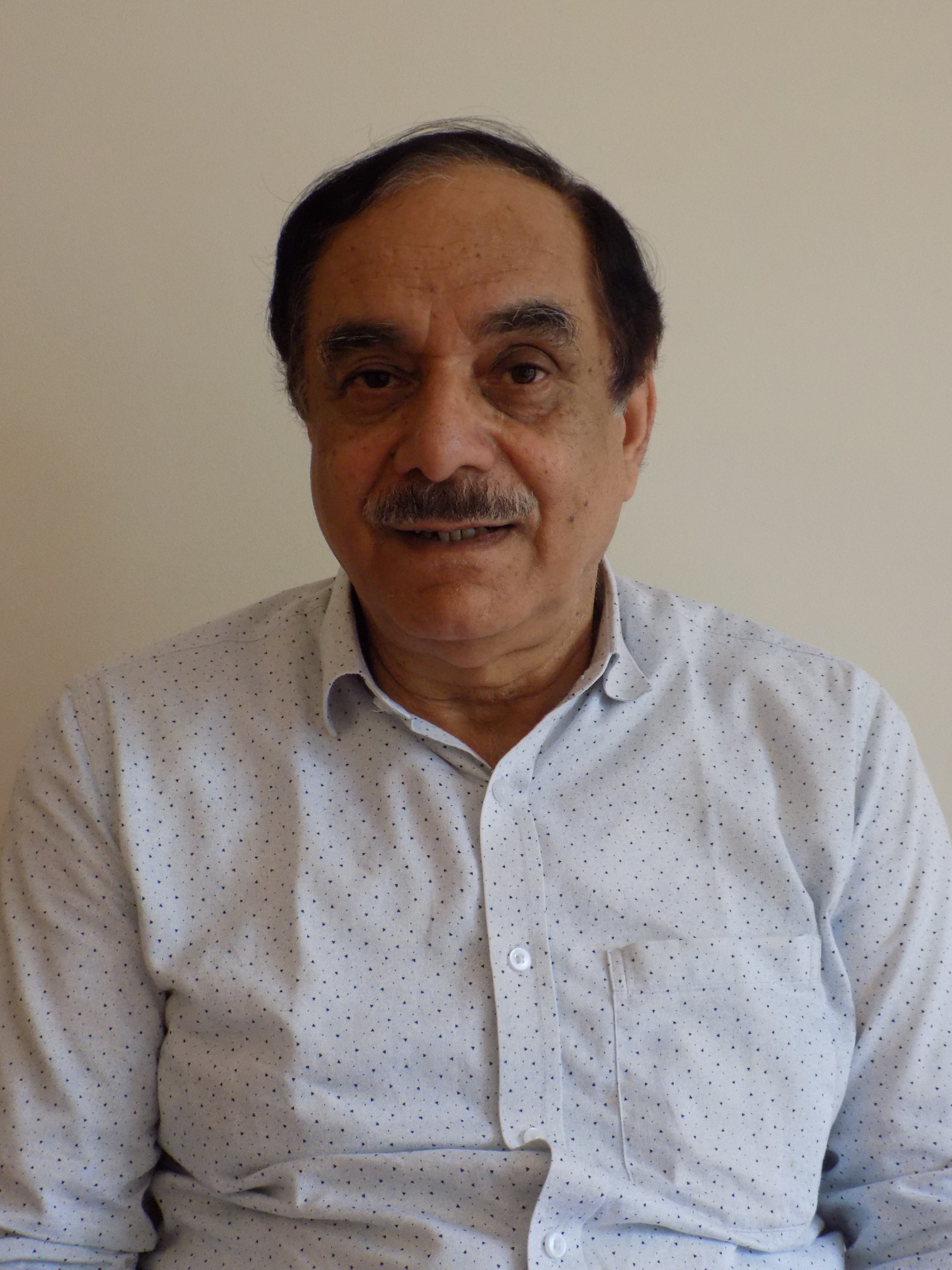
- Born: 17 December 1955 (age 70); Haryana, India
- Occupation: Scientist ‘H’ Outstanding Scientist
- Children: 2

Harsh Vardhan Batra is an Indian scientist working in animal biotechnology at the Department of Biotechnology (DBT), of the Indian Ministry of Science and Technology. He is a former director of the Defence Food Research Laboratory (DFRL), a Defence Research and Development Organisation (DRDO) establishment at Mysore (April 2012 – December 2015). As a specialist in infectious diseases, he participated in the DRDO biodefence preparedness program, and was an expert member of the technical advisory committee on plague constituted by the government of India in September 1994. He served as technical consultant for the design and construction of high containment laboratories for DRDO, the Indian Council for Agricultural Research (ICAR) and Indian Council of Medical Research (ICMR). He participated in the United Nations Biological Weapons Convention (BTWC) ad hoc group meetings in Geneva as a member of the Indian delegation, and conducted World Health Organization (WHO) Southeast Asia Regional Office meetings and workshops on infectious diseases.

== Education ==
Earned MVSc in Bacteriology and Hygiene (1979) and PhD in Veterinary Public Health and Epidemiology (1985) from Chaudhary Charan Singh Haryana Agricultural University in Hisar. In 1987 he conducted post-doctoral research at the Medical Research Council (MRC) in the Tuberculosis and Related Infections Unit at Hammersmith Hospital in London.

== Career ==
Senior scientific officer and head of the mycobacteriology laboratory, National Institute of Immunology in New Delhi from 1984 to Nov.1990. Scientist at DRDO in Gwalior from November 1990 to February 2006. Additional Director, DFRL, Mysore from February 2006 to April 2012 and Director from April 2012 to December 2015.

He conducted disease outbreak investigations as DRDO Life Sciences team leader during biological emergencies such as:

- Plague outbreaks at
  - Surat, Gujarat and
  - Beed, Maharashtra
    - August and September 1994.
- Pneumonic plague in Shimla (Himachal Pradesh), February 2002.
- Suspected leptospirosis outbreaks:
  - Delhi: Aug 2000
  - Orissa: July – August 2002
  - Kerala: Oct. 2002
  - Kerala: October- November 2003
  - Maharashtra: Aug 2005
- Suspected cholera outbreaks
  - Bhind (MP) in May–June 2004
  - Delhi in July–August 2004
- Anthrax outbreak investigation at Gundlupet (Karnataka), 2013.
- Anthrax outbreak investigation at Hindupur (Andhra Pradesh), 2014.
- Anthrax outbreak at Mysore in November 2001
- Anthrax scares due to suspect powder in envelopes, October 2001 – 2003.

== Awards ==
- First position Prizes in M.V.Sc. and PhD. In 1979 & 1985, respectively
- National Institute of Immunology Product Development Award in 1988
- DRDO Technology Cash Award in 1996
- Ganti Sastri Gold Medal for best publication in 1998
- DRDO Scientist of the Year Award in 2002
- First Prize in paper presentation at the Indian Convention of Food Scientists and Technologists (ICFOST), 2009
- Two Best posters in paper presentation in Eleventh Sir Tata Dorabji Symposium on Diagnostics in Infection, Indian Institute of Science, 2010
- First prize for the paper presentation in National Seminar on Microbial Diversity – Exploration & Bioprospecting, 2010
- Best research paper in DFRL, 2010
- First prize in paper presentation in National Seminar on Recent Trends in Microbial Techniques at Kakatiya University, 2011
- First prize in paper presentation in World Congress on Biotechnology at Hyderabad during March 2011
- First prize in paper presented during 52nd AMI conference held at Chandigarh during Nov. 2011
- Three best awards for papers presented at International Symposium on Recent Trends in Processing and Safety of Speciality and Operational Foods at DFRL in November 2011
- Best research paper award in P.R. Verma Award competition 2012
- Best research paper award in Association of Microbiology of India award competition
- Two Best Paper awards in National conference held at Kakatiya University 2012
- Best poster paper award in national conference held at Vellore Institute of Technology, 2012
- Best Research paper award- TSICON-2013, International Conference on Biology of Natural toxins- Goa, BITS-pilani.
- Titanium Trophy Award 2012 - Received from Prine Minister Manmohan Singh, 31 July 2012, New Delhi
- Defence Technology Spin-Off Award 2013 - Received from Prime Minister Narendra Modi, August 2014
- PROF. J. V. BHAT MEMORIAL ORATION AWARD 2015 NATIONAL FOR SIGNIFICANT CONTRIBUTION TOWARDS "DIAGNOSTIC MICROBIOLOGY".
- PATH BREAKING RESEARCH AND OUTSTANDING TECHNOLOGY DEVELOPMENT received from Honourable Raksha manthri Sri. Manohar Parikar on 23 Sept. 2015 in Delhi.
