= Defence Food Research Laboratory =

Indian defense laboratory

- Established: 28 December 1961
- Director: Dr AD Semwal
- Location: Siddhartha Nagar, Mysore - 570 011, Mysore, Karnataka, India; 12.30995°N 76.67809°E
- Operating agency: DRDO
- Website: Defence Food Research Laboratory website

Map
- Location within Karnataka Location within India

The Defence Food Research Laboratory (DFRL) is an Indian defence laboratory of the Defence Research and Development Organisation (DRDO). Located in Mysore, Karnataka, it conducts research and development of technologies and products in the area of food science and technology to cater the varied food challenges for the Indian Armed Forces. DFRL is organised under the Life Sciences Directorate of DRDO. The present director of DFRL is Dr. A D Semwal.

== History ==
"The Defence Food Research Laboratory (DFRL) came into being on 28th December 1961 under the aegis of Defence Research and Development Organisation (DRDO), Ministry of Defence, Government of India, at Mysore especially to cater to the varied food challenges of the Indian Army, Navy, Airforce and other paramilitary forces." In 2015, DRFL distributed ready-to-eat food in Chennai's flooded areas.

== Areas of work ==
- Research and development in food science and technology
- Studies in the development of convenience foods, preservation of foods, food safety, food packaging, and studies in the spoilage of foods and safety of processed foods
- Production and supply of processed foods on a limited scale to the Armed Forces and other bodies for national missions
- Toxicological, nutritional, and biochemical studies
- Development of pack rations, their quality assurance methods
- Preservation and packaging methods for long-distance transportation of perishable products
- Evaluation of nutritional requirements of troops deployed under different climatic conditions
- Development of various millet products.
- Development of biodegradable water bottles.

The Laboratory has testing facilities and analytical instruments such as GC, GCMS, GLC, HPLC, Nanodrop spectrophotometer, Atomic Absorption Spectrophotometer, Lovibond Tintometer, etc. Animal house enables nutritional and safety evaluation of a variety of foods. Some of the recent additions to the processing equipments include, High pressure processing, Pulsed electric field processing, Khoa making machine, controlled atmosphere system, integrated soya paneer plant, blast freezer and plate freezer lyophilizer, polymer twin screw extruders. Food Scanner, Texturometer, Hydrosorb, Hybridization oven, Image analyser, Thermogravimetric Analyser, Differential scanning colorimeter, Dynamic mechanical analyser, Alveoconsisto graph, Cell counter, Gradient thermal cycler, Scanning electron microscope, FPHLC, Gel Documentation system, IR Spectroscope and Atomic Force microscope.

The Laboratory has developed some analytical test kits for evaluation of deteriorative changes in food such as Meat Testing Kit, Test Kit for E.coli detection, Presumptive Test Kit for Coliform Detection, Acidity Testing Paper Strip, Pesticide detection kit.

== Projects and products ==
=== Technologies for civilian use ===
Many of the DFRL foods, born out of innovative state-of-the-art technologies, lend themselves eminently suitable to industrial scale commercial exploitation by enterprising entrepreneurs of different genre. Some of the technologies that have been transferred to entrepreneurs are:

- Retort processing in flexible pouches
- Mini combo pack ration
- Freeze dried foods
- Preservation of tender coconut water
- Preserved and flavoured chapatis
- Instant/Quick cooking foods
- Puff and serve chapatis
- Short term preserved chapatis
- Scrambled egg mix
- Combo pack ration
- Supplementary compo pack ration
- Cold stock drying technology
- Instant choley mix technology
- Minimally processed pre-cut vegetables
- Ethylene absorbed pad/scrubber development
- IM/HT fruits

== See also ==
- Harsh Vardhan Batra
