= 4-Phenylthiosemicarbazide =

Names
- Preferred IUPAC name N-Phenylhydrazinecarbothioamide
- Other names N-Phenyl-hydrazinecarbothioamide, USAF-EK-5426, USAF-EL-45

Identifiers
CAS Number	5351-69-9
3D model (JSmol)	Interactive image; Interactive image
ChemSpider	638258
ECHA InfoCard	100.023.935
PubChem CID	730679
UNII	RBH3R5JE2H
CompTox Dashboard (EPA)	DTXSID6063808
- InChI: InChI=1S/C7H9N3S/c8-10-7(11)9-6-4-2-1-3-5-6/h1-5H,8H2,(H2,9,10,11) Key: KKIGUVBJOHCXSP-UHFFFAOYSA-N; InChI=1/C7H9N3S/c8-10-7(11)9-6-4-2-1-3-5-6/h1-5H,8H2,(H2,9,10,11) Key: KKIGUVBJOHCXSP-UHFFFAOYAT
- SMILES: C1=CC=C(C=C1)NC(=S)NN; S=C(Nc1ccccc1)NN

Properties
Chemical formula	C_{7}H_{9}N_{3}S
Molar mass	167.23 g·mol^{−1}
Appearance	White to light yellow crystalline powder
Melting point	138 to 141 °C (280 to 286 °F; 411 to 414 K)
Boiling point	308 °C (586 °F; 581 K)
- Except where otherwise noted, data are given for materials in their standard state (at 25 °C [77 °F], 100 kPa). verify (what is ?) Infobox references

4-Phenylthiosemicarbazide (4-PTSC) is a thiosemicarbazide used as an agricultural chemical and pesticide. It also possesses antibacterial properties attributed to electron delocalization in the thiosemicarbazide moiety.
