= Pesticide misuse =

Under United States law, pesticide misuse is considered to be the use of a pesticide in a way that violates laws regulating their use or endangers humans or the environment; many of these regulations are laid out in the Federal Insecticide, Fungicide, and Rodenticide Act (FIFRA). Pesticide misuse encompasses a range of practices, including overapplication, incorrect timing, and the use of banned substances. This global issue not only threatens environmental safety but also undermines efforts towards sustainability. The risk of pesticide pollution at a global scale necessitates a concerted effort to understand and mitigate misuse. The most common instances of pesticide misuse are applications inconsistent with the labeling, which can include the use of a material in any way not described on the label, changing dosage rates, or violating specific safety instructions. Pesticide labels have been criticized as a poor risk communication vehicle, leading some officials and researchers to question whether "misuse" is an appropriate term for what are often "unintended uses" resulting from a poor understanding of safety and application instructions. Other kinds of pesticide misuse include the sale or use of an unregistered pesticide or one whose registration has been revoked and the sale or use of an adulterated or misbranded pesticide. Under most jurisdictions, it is illegal to alter or remove pesticide labels, to sell restricted pesticides to an uncertified applicator, or to fail to maintain sales and use records of restricted pesticides.

Pesticides are toxic compounds, and their labels are specifically designed to encourage safe and effective use. Ignoring the directions can lead to civil and criminal charges and civil liability for damages to other parties.

== Health effects ==
=== In humans ===
Pesticide misuse can be associated with pesticide poisoning. Reported effects range from mild skin irritation to seizures and death. The effects of poisoning vary drastically depending on dosage and levels of exposure. The types of pesticides most often present in poisonings are organophosphates and N-methyl carbamates, pyrethrin and synthetic pyrethroid insecticides, and organochloride insecticides. Certain fumigants, nematicides, herbicides, and dipyridyls are also common in cases of pesticide poisoning.

One of the best known cases of pesticide misuse in recent history involved the application of a pesticide intended for outdoor agricultural use (methyl parathion) to homes in Mississippi for cockroaches and other home pests. Two exterminators were charged with multiple criminal charges after their ongoing use (of several years) was exposed. A number of residents, including two infants, suffered symptoms of pesticide poisoning. A number of homes and business, including several day care centers and schools were rendered uninhabitable or unusable. Heavy fines and prison terms followed for the perpetrators.

=== In other animals ===
Pesticide misuse can also endanger wildlife and other environmental resources.

Birds Birds are particularly susceptible to pesticide exposure. Certain pesticides, such as organophosphates and carbamates, interfere with the nervous systems of birds, leading to reduced reproductive success and increased mortality rates. The thinning of eggshells caused by DDT, a now-banned pesticide, is a well-documented example. This phenomenon led to a decline in the populations of several bird species, including the bald eagle and peregrine falcon.

Mammals Mammals can also suffer from pesticide exposure. Rodents and other small mammals are at risk of ingesting pesticides directly or through contaminated food sources. This can result in acute poisoning or chronic health issues, such as reproductive and developmental problems. Predatory mammals, such as foxes and weasels, can be indirectly affected through bioaccumulation, where they consume prey that has been exposed to pesticides.

Insects Beneficial insects, including pollinators like bees and butterflies, are highly vulnerable to pesticides. Neonicotinoids, a class of insecticides, have been linked to the decline of bee populations due to their neurotoxic effects. These pesticides impair foraging behavior, reduce reproductive success, and increase susceptibility to diseases and parasites. The decline in pollinator populations poses a significant threat to biodiversity and agriculture.

Aquatic Life Aquatic animals are impacted by pesticide runoff from agricultural fields and urban areas. Fish and amphibians are particularly at risk as pesticides can contaminate water bodies, leading to lethal and sublethal effects. Pesticides can disrupt the endocrine systems of fish, affecting their growth, reproduction, and development. Amphibians, which have permeable skin, are highly sensitive to waterborne pesticides, leading to population declines and deformities.

Reptiles Reptiles, such as snakes and lizards, can also be affected by pesticide exposure. These animals may encounter pesticides through direct contact with treated areas or by consuming contaminated prey. The impacts on reptiles can include decreased fertility, altered behavior, and increased mortality rates.

Notable Instance of Pesticide misuse: A Florida man was recently cited and fined $23,100 for using the pesticide Aldicarb on deer carcasses to kill coyotes, for storing the pesticide in unlabeled containers, and not being a certified applicator.

Specific label directions are given on materials that are toxic to bees, because these pollinators are considered an important environmental resource. A typical bee-protection label direction reads: "This product is highly toxic to bees exposed to direct treatment on blooming crops or weeds. Do not apply this product or allow it to drift to blooming crops or weeds if bees are visiting the treatment area." In 2013, over 25,000 bumblebees died as a result of pesticide misuse in Wilsonville, Oregon. A South Carolina farmer was also cited and fined for pesticide misuse, because he sprayed a blooming cucumber field while bees were foraging on the blossoms, causing a serious bee kill. Similar bee kills have impacted US beekeepers and the growers who need bees for pollination billions of dollars in losses. Efforts to curb pesticide misuse are critical, especially in agricultural countries where literacy barriers and lack of training contribute significantly to the problem. Programs like Integrated Pest Management (IPM) training have shown promise in reducing misuse and enhancing crop yields.

== Contributing factors ==
Pesticide misuse occurs most frequently in developing countries and in countries with predominantly agricultural economies. Several factors contribute to pesticide misuse, but ecological researchers have found language barriers and illiteracy to be among the most common. Safety data sheets for pesticides are available in a variety of languages, but the farmers and agricultural workers who are responsible for pesticide application are often unable to read them. Limited education and a lack of proper training tend to be among the most significant contributing factors to improper handling and application of pesticides. The majority of agricultural workers and rural farmers in developing countries have received only a few years of primary education, which contributes to the illiteracy of these populations. Farmers in underdeveloped countries also frequently misuse pesticides due to improper training; however, Integrated Pest Management training has been shown to reduce rates of improper handling and application of pesticides while simultaneously increasing crop yields.

== See also ==
- National Pesticide Information Center
- Pesticide drift
