= Pesticide degradation =

Pesticide degradation is the process by which a pesticide is transformed into a benign substance that is environmentally compatible with the site to which it was applied. Globally, an estimated 1 to 2.5 million tons of active pesticide ingredients are used each year, mainly in agriculture. Forty percent are herbicides, followed by insecticides and fungicides. Since their initial development in the 1940s, multiple chemical pesticides with different uses and modes of action have been employed. Pesticides are applied over large areas in agriculture and urban settings. Pesticide use, therefore, represents an important source of diffuse chemical environmental inputs.

== Persistence ==
In principle, pesticides are registered for use only after they are demonstrated not to persist in the environment considerably beyond their intended period of use. Typically, documented soil half-lives are in the range of days to weeks. However, pesticide residues are found ubiquitously in the environment in ng/liter to low μg/liter concentrations. For instance, surveys of groundwater and not-yet-treated potable water in industrialized countries typically detect 10 to 20 substances in recurrent findings above 0.01 μg/dL (3.6×10^{−12} lb/cu in) the maximum accepted drinking water concentration for pesticides in many countries. About half of the detected substances are no longer in use and another 10 to 20% are stable transformation products.

Pesticide residues have been found in other realms. Transport from groundwater may lead to a low-level presence in surface waters. Pesticides have been detected in high-altitude regions, demonstrating sufficient persistence to survive transport across hundreds of kilometers in the atmosphere.

Degradation involves both biotic and abiotic transformation processes. Biotic transformation is mediated by microorganisms, while abiotic transformation involves processes such as chemical and photochemical reactions. The specific degradation processes for a given pesticide are determined by its structure and by the environmental conditions it experiences. Redox gradients in soils, sediments or aquifers often determine which transformations can occur. Similarly, photochemical transformations require sunlight, available only in the topmost meter(s) of lakes or rivers, plant surfaces or submillimeter soil layers. Atmospheric phototransformation is another potential remediating influence.

Information on pesticide degradation is available from the required test data. This includes laboratory tests on aqueous hydrolysis, photolysis in water and air, biodegradability in soils and water-sediment systems under aerobic and anaerobic conditions and fate in soil lysimeters. These studies provide little insight into how individual transformation processes contribute to observed degradation in situ. Therefore, they do not offer a rigorous understanding of how specific environmental conditions (e.g., the presence of certain reactants) affect degradation. Such studies further fail to cover unusual environmental conditions such as strongly sulfidic environments such as estuaries or prairie potholes, nor do they reveal transformations at low residual concentrations at which biodegradation may stop. Thus, although molecular structure generally predicts intrinsic reactivity, quantitative predictions are limited.

== Biotic transformation ==
Biodegradation is generally recognized as the biggest contributor to degradation. Whereas plants, animals and fungi (Eukaryota) typically transform pesticides for detoxification through metabolism by broad-spectrum enzymes, bacteria (Prokaryota) more commonly metabolize them. This dichotomy is likely due to a wider range of sensitive targets in Eukaryota. For example, organophosphate esters that interfere with nerve signal transmission in insects do not affect microbial processes and offer nourishment for microorganisms whose enzymes can hydrolyze phosphotriesters. Bacteria are more likely to contain such enzymes because of their strong selection for new enzymes and metabolic pathways that supply essential nutrients. In addition, genes move horizontally within microbial populations, spreading newly evolved degradation pathways.

Some transformations, particularly substitutions, can proceed both biotically and abiotically, although enzyme-catalyzed reactions typically reach higher rates. For example, the hydrolytic dechlorination of atrazine to hydroxyatrazine in soil by atrazine-dechlorinating bacterial enzymes reached a second-order rate constant of 105/mole/second, likely dominating in the environment. In other cases, enzymes facilitate reactions with no abiotic counterpart, as with the herbicide glyphosate, which contains a C-P bond that is stable with respect to light, reflux in strong acid or base, and other abiotic conditions. Microbes that cleave the C-P bond are widespread in the environment, and some can metabolize glyphosate. The C-P lyase enzyme system is encoded by a complicated 14-gene operon.

Biodegradation transformation intermediates may accumulate when the enzymes that produce the intermediate operate more slowly than those that consume it. In atrazine metabolism, for example, a substantial steady-state level of hydroxyatrazine accumulates from such a process. In other situations (e.g., in agricultural wastewater treatment), microorganisms mostly grow on other, more readily assimilable carbon substrates, whereas pesticides present at trace concentrations are transformed through fortuitous metabolism, producing potentially recalcitrant intermediates.

Pesticides persist over decades in groundwater, although bacteria are in principle abundant and potentially able to degrade them for unknown reasons. This may be related to the observation that microbial degradation appears to stall at low pesticide concentrations in low-nutrient environments such as groundwater. As yet, very little is known about pesticide biodegradation under such conditions. Methods have been lacking to follow biodegradation in groundwater over the relevant long time scales and to isolate relevant degraders from such environments.

== Abiotic Transformation ==
In surface waters, phototransformation can substantially contribute to degradation. In “direct” phototransformation, photons are absorbed by the contaminant, while in “indirect” phototransformation, reactive species are formed through photon absorption by other substances. Pesticide electronic absorption spectra typically show little overlap with sunlight, such that only a few (e.g., trifluralin) are affected by direct phototransformation. Various photochemically active light absorbers are present in surface waters, enhancing indirect phototransformation. The most prominent is dissolved organic matter (DOM), which is the precursor of excited triplet states, molecular oxygen, superoxide radical anions, and other radicals. Nitrate and nitrite ions produce hydroxyl radicals under irradiation. Indirect phototransformation is thus the result of parallel reactions with all available reactive species. The transformation rate depends on the concentrations of all relevant reactive species, together with their corresponding second-order rate constants for a given pesticide. These constants are known for hydroxyl radical and molecular oxygen. In the absence of such rate constants, quantitative structure–activity relationships(QSARs) may allow their estimation for a specific pesticide from its chemical structure.

The relevance of "dark" (aphotic) abiotic transformations varies by pesticide. The presence of functional groups supports textbook predictions for some compounds. For example, aqueous abiotic hydrolysis degrades organophosphates, carboxylic acid esters, carbamates, carbonates, some halides (methyl bromide, propargyl) and many more. Other pesticides are less amenable. Conditions such as high pH or low-redox environments combined with in situ catalyst formation including (poly)sulfides, surface-bound Fe(II) or MnO_{2}. Microorganisms often mediate the latter, blurring the boundary between abiotic and biotic transformations. Chemical reactions may also prevail in compartments such as groundwater or lake hypolimnion, which have hydraulic retention times on the order of years and where biomass densities are lower due to the almost complete absence of assimilable organic carbon.

== Prediction ==
Available strategies to identify in situ pesticide transformation include measuring remnant or transformation product concentrations and estimating of a given environment's theoretical transformation potential. Measurements are only usable on the micro- or mesocosm scale.

Gas chromatography–mass spectrometry (GC-MS) or liquid chromatography-tandem mass spectrometry (LC-MS/MS) does not distinguish transformation from other processes such as dilution or sorption unless combined with stringent mass balance modelling. Carbon 14-labeled pesticides do enable mass balances, but investigations with radioactively tagged substrates cannot be conducted in the field.

Transformation product detection may calibrate degradation. Target analysis is straightforward when products and standards are understood, while suspect/nontarget analysis can be attempted otherwise. High-resolution mass spectrometry facilitated the development of multi-component analytical methods for 150 pesticide transformation products and for screening for suspected transformation products. In combination with transformation product structure models, screening allows a more comprehensive assessment of transformation products, independent of field degradation studies.

Isotopic analysis may complement product measurements because it can measure degradation in the absence of metabolites and has the potential to cover sufficiently long time scales to assess transformation in groundwater. Isotope ratios (e.g.,^{13}C/^{12}C, ^{15}N/^{14}N) can reveal history in the absence of any label. Because kinetic isotope effects typically favor the transformation of light isotopes (e.g., ^{12}C), heavy isotopes (13C) become enriched in residues. An increased ^{13}C/^{12}C isotope ratio in a parent compound thus provides direct evidence of degradation. Repeated pesticide analyses, in groundwater over time, or direct measurements in combination with groundwater dating that show increasing ^{13}C/^{12}C isotope ratios in a parent pesticide, provides direct evidence of degradation, even if the pesticide was released long before. Multiple transformation pathways were revealed for atrazine by measuring the isotope effects of multiple elements. In such a case, transformation mechanisms are identifiable from plots of ^{13}C/^{12}C versus ^{15}N/^{14}N parent compound data, reflecting different underlying carbon- and nitrogen-isotope effects. The approach requires a relatively high amount of substance for gas chromatography–isotope ratio mass spectrometry (GC-IRMS) or LC-IRMS analysis (100 ng to 1 μg), which, for instance, requires extraction of 10 liters of groundwater at pesticide concentrations of 100 ng/liter. For the special case of chiral pesticides, enantiomer analysis may substitute for isotopes in such analyses as a result of stereoselective reactions. Combining isotope and chirality measurement can increase prediction strength.

Geochemical analysis including pH, redox potential and dissolved ions is routinely applied to assess the potential for biotic and abiotic transformations, complicated by any lack of specificity in the targets. Selective probe compounds must be used to detect individual reactive species when a mixture of reactive species is present. Combining probe compounds and scavengers or quenchers increases accuracy. E.g., N, N-dimethylaniline, used as a probe for the carbonate radical reacts very quickly with DOM-excited triplet states and its oxidation is hampered by DOM.

13C-labeled parent pesticides were used in the nontarget analysis of degraders by stable isotope probing (SIP) to demonstrate biotransformation potential in soil and sediment samples. A complimentary, potentially more quantitative technique is to directly enumerate the biodegradative gene(s) via quantitative polymerase chain reaction (QPCR), gene sequencing or functional gene microarrays. A prerequisite for genetic approaches, however, is that the involved genes can be clearly linked to a given transformation reaction. For instance, the atzD gene encoding cyanuric acid hydrolase correlates with atrazine biodegradation in agricultural soil surface layers, consistent with AtzD's cleavage of the s-triazine ring during bacterial atrazine metabolism. AtzD was unambiguously identifiable and hence quantifiable, as unusually, it belongs to a protein family that largely consists of biodegradative enzymes. Most proteins studied to date are members of very large protein superfamilies, with as many as 600,000 individual members, with diverse functions. Another factor confounding gene-based approaches is that biodegradative function can arise independently in evolution, such that multiple unrelated genes catalyze the same reaction. E.g., organophosphate esterases that differ markedly in their fold and mechanism can act on the same organophosphate pesticide.

== Transformation products ==
Even though their undesirable effects are typically lowered, transformation products may remain problematic. Some transformations leave active moiety intact, such as oxidation of thioethers to sulfones and sulfoxides. Parent/transformation product mixtures may have additive effects. Second, some products are more potent than their parents. Phenolic degradates of such diverse chemical classes as pyrethroids and aryloxyphenoxypropionic herbicides may act on estrogen receptor. Such products should receive particular attention because they are often smaller and more polar than their parents. This increases their potential to reach drinking water resources such as groundwater and surface waters, where polar products are found at fairly constant concentrations. Products in drinking water resources may cause problems such as formation of carcinogenic N-nitroso-dimethylamine from dimethylsulfamide, a microbial product of the fungicides tolylfluanide and dichlofluanide, during water treatment with ozone.

The issue is specifically addressed in major regulatory frameworks. In Europe, for instance, "nonrelevant" metabolites are distinguished from metabolites that are "relevant for groundwater resources" or even "ecotoxicologically relevant". The latter are those whose risk to soil or aquatic biota is comparable to or higher than the parent and must meet the same standards as their parent. Groundwater-relevant metabolites are those likely to reach groundwater in concentrations above 0.1 μg/liter and to display the same toxicity as the parent compound. In the past toxicology issues typically emerged only decades after market introduction. Examples are the detection of chloridazon products (first marketed in 1964) in surface and groundwater, or tolylfluanid (first marketed in 1971). That these substances were overlooked for so long may partially be attributable to prior limits on analytical capabilities. However, labeling some metabolites as nonrelevant may have resulted in directing attention away from them. The decision to tolerate up to 10 μg/liter of "nonrelevant" metabolites in groundwater and drinking water is politically highly contentious in Europe. Some consider the higher limit acceptable as no imminent health risk can be proven, whereas others regard it as a fundamental deviation from the precautionary principle.
