= Non-pesticide management =

Non-pesticidal Management (NPM) describes various pest-control techniques which do not rely on pesticides. It is used in organic production of foodstuff, as well as in other situations in which the introduction of toxins is undesirable. Instead of the use of synthetic toxins, pest control is achieved by biological means.

Some examples of Non-Pesticidal Management techniques include:

- Introduction of natural predators.
- Use of naturally occurring insecticides, such as Neem tree products, Margosa, Tulsi / Basil Leaf, Citrus Oil, Eucalyptus Oil, Onion, Garlic spray, Essential Oils. These also refer to as Organic Pesticides.
- Use of trap crops which attract the insects away from the fields. The trap crops are regularly checked and pests are manually removed.
- Pest larvae which were killed by viruses can be crushed and sprayed over fields, thus killing the remaining larvae.
- Field sanitation.
- Timely sowing.
- Nutrient management.
- Maintain proper plant population.
- Soil solarisation
- Deep summer ploughing.

Over years insects have withstood natural calamities and survived successfully. They are able to develop resistance to chemical pesticides insecticides used by farmers. To be successful, farmers should be knowledgeable and able to identify various crop pests, and their natural enemies (farmer’s friendly insects). Farmers should recognize different stages of insects and their behavior. The efforts to minimize pests should aim at restoring the natural balance of insects in crop ecosystem but not elimination of the pest.

== Principles of NPM ==
Encouraging natural process in environment
Crop ecosystem should be diverse by growing inter crops, trap crops, border crops in place of mono cropping. Once the insecticide sprays stopped, natural enemies of crop pests gradually establish and exercise control of crop pests, which can be enhanced with botanical extracts like NSKE, chilli garlic extract, cattle dung urine decoction etc.

Management skill
Selecting crop based on soil, water resources, climate and local pest problems that occur regularly, crop rotation, adjustment of sowing dates to avoid endemic pests, setting up light and pheromone traps, keeping sticky traps and bird perches.

Local resources
Using locally available organic amendments for soil improvement and pest control. The extracts are prepared and used as prophylactic or curative measures aimed to restore the disturbed natural balance.

Labor
Shunning chemical inputs and out of shelf products farmer should invest his labor as main investment like regular monitoring of the crop and following methods like deep summer ploughing and shaking plants to dislodge pod borers in pigeonpea.

Community approach
Pest problem of a farmer not only depends on the crop and management practices of one farmer in isolation. To a large extent it depends on crops cultivated by neighboring farmers and measures taken by them. Hence, identification of activities that necessitate group action and implementing them would be most important aspect in NPM /sustainable agriculture.
