= Pesticide detection kit =

A Pesticide detection kit is a scientific test kit that detects the presence of pesticide residues. Various organizations create them, among them Defence Food Research Laboratory of India.
