= Davicil =

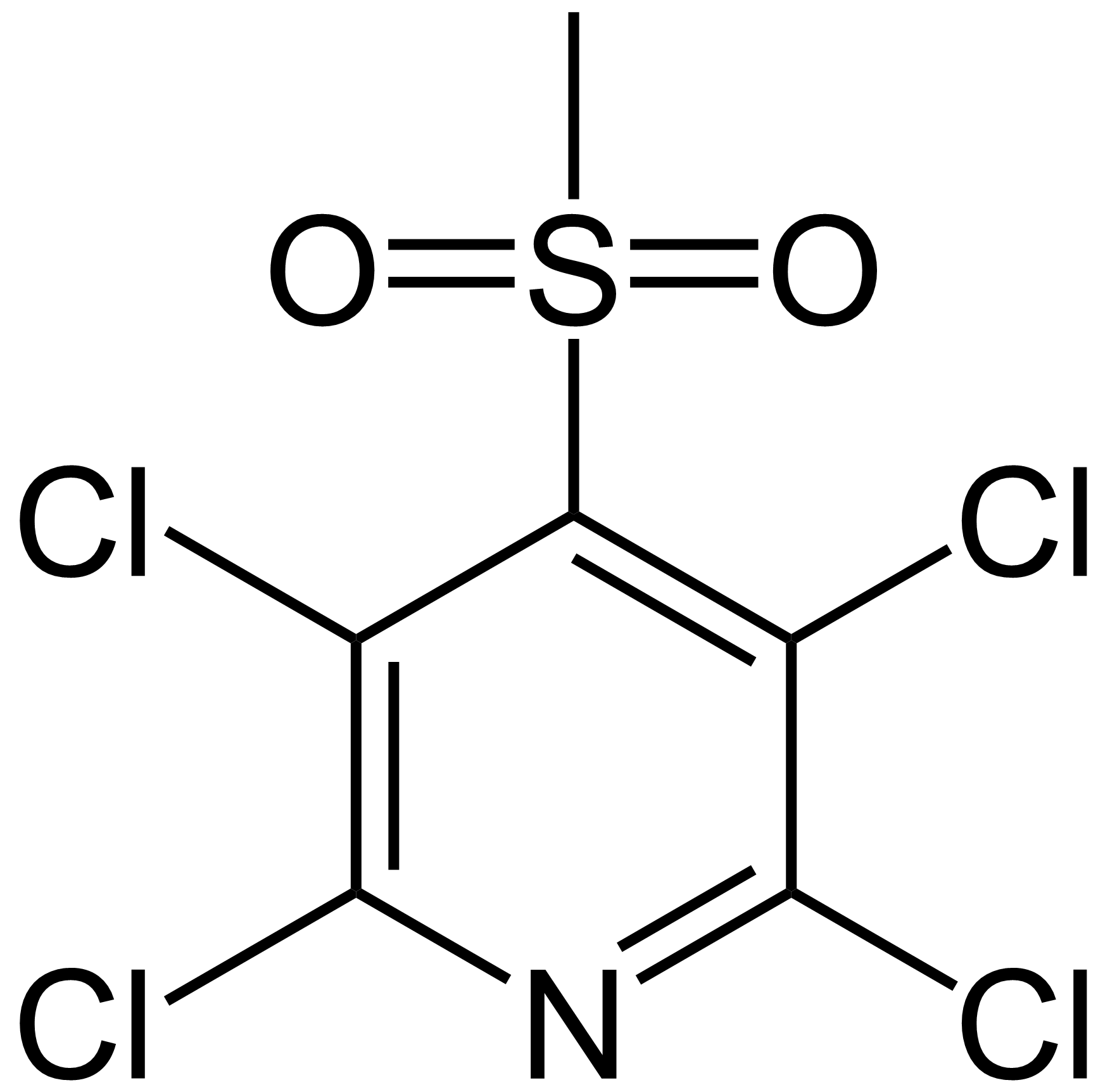
- Davicil skeletal structure

Names
- Preferred IUPAC name 2,3,5,6-Tetrachloro-4-(methanesulfonyl)pyridine
- Other names Tetrachloromethylsulfonylpyridine

Identifiers
CAS Number	13108-52-6
3D model (JSmol)	Interactive image; Interactive image
ChemSpider	55492
ECHA InfoCard	100.032.744
PubChem CID	61579
UNII	92AGR11YJB
CompTox Dashboard (EPA)	DTXSID4044795
- InChI: InChI=1S/C6H3Cl4NO2S/c1-14(12,13)4-2(7)5(9)11-6(10)3(4)8/h1H3 Key: NMCCNOZOBBWFMN-UHFFFAOYSA-N; InChI=1/C6H3Cl4NO2S/c1-14(12,13)4-2(7)5(9)11-6(10)3(4)8/h1H3 Key: NMCCNOZOBBWFMN-UHFFFAOYAE
- SMILES: Clc1c(c(Cl)c(Cl)nc1Cl)S(=O)(=O)C; CS(=O)(=O)C1=C(C(=NC(=C1Cl)Cl)Cl)Cl

Properties
Chemical formula	C_{6}H_{3}Cl_{4}NO_{2}S
Molar mass	294.970 g/mol
- Except where otherwise noted, data are given for materials in their standard state (at 25 °C [77 °F], 100 kPa). verify (what is ?) Infobox references

Davicil is a chlorinated pyridine derivative with antimicrobial properties, which is used as a fungicide. It can be allergenic in humans and produce contact dermatitis.
