= Maintenance fee (EPA) =

Fee paid to the United States EPA by pesticide manufacturers

In United States environmental policy, maintenance fees are the annual fees paid by pesticide manufacturers and formulators to continue registration of pesticide active ingredients and products with the Environmental Protection Agency (EPA). The fees supplement funds appropriated from general U.S. revenues, which cover most administrative costs of the EPA pesticide program under the Federal Insecticide, Fungicide, and Rodenticide Act (FIFRA; 7 U.S.C. 136a-1). Fees are deposited into a separate Reregistration and Expedited Processing Fund to offset costs associated with EPA reregistration activities and expedited processing of pesticide registrations that are substantially similar to registrations already in effect or which are for public health pesticides, as defined in FIFRA Section 2(nn). Congress mandated collection of an annual maintenance fee from each pesticide registrant in 1988 amendments to (P.L. 100-532). EPA has authority to cancel a registration if a registrant fails to pay the maintenance fee.
