= The Ramrods (punk band) =

American punk rock band (1977–1978)

- Origin: Detroit, Michigan, U.S.
- Genres: Punk rock
- Years active: 1977–1978
- Label: Young Soul Rebels
- Past members: Mark Norton; Peter James; Dave Hanna; Bob Mulrooney

The Ramrods were a punk rock band from Detroit, USA which debuted in 1977. The last official Ramrods show was January 28, 1978, at the Red Carpet.

The quartet, composed of Mark Norton on vocals, Peter James on guitar, Dave Hanna on bass, and Bob Mulrooney on drums, was short-lived—the group disbanded days before the Sex Pistols expired. When the band was intact, they had serious interest from Ramones manager Danny Fields and from Sire's Seymour Stein.

After the split, guitarist James, who was also in early incarnations of power pop band The Romantics, and drummer Mulrooney joined Nikki Corvette and the Convertibles. Mulrooney later split and joined The Sillies, and eventually formed Bootsey X & the Lovemasters. Bassist Hanna and Norton formed The 27.

== Band members ==
Former members

- Mark Norton − lead vocals (1977–1978)
- Peter James − guitar (1977–1978)
- Dave Hanna − bass (1977–1978)
- Bob Mulrooney − drums (1977–1978)

== Discography ==
=== Archival albums ===
- Gimme Some Action (2004, Young Soul Rebels)
