= Propachlor =

Weed control herbicide

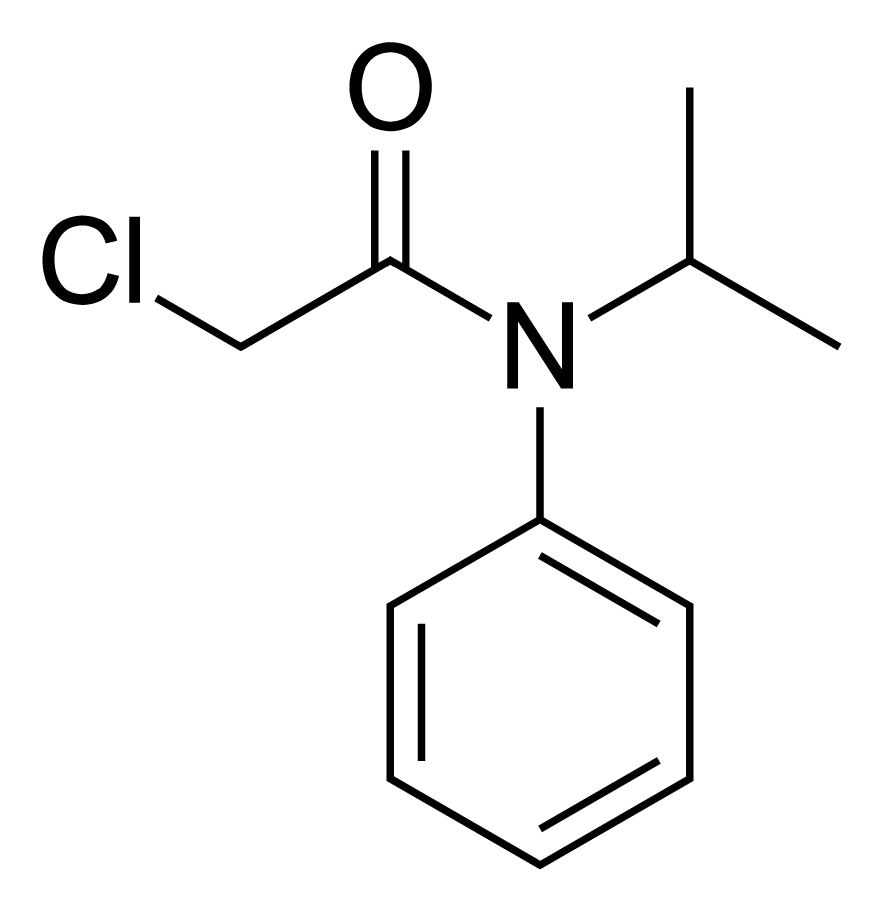

Names
- Preferred IUPAC name 2-Chloro-N-phenyl-N-(propan-2-yl)acetamide
- Other names: 2-Chloro-N-isopropylacetanilide; N-Isopropyl-2-chloroacetanilide; Ramrod (trade name); Bexton (trade name); Nitacid (trade name); Satecid (trade name)

Identifiers
CAS Number	1918-16-7
3D model (JSmol)	Interactive image
ChEMBL	ChEMBL1394829
ChemSpider	4762
ECHA InfoCard	100.016.036
PubChem CID	4931
UNII	015443A483
CompTox Dashboard (EPA)	DTXSID4024274
- InChI: InChI=1S/C11H14ClNO/c1-9(2)13(11(14)8-12)10-6-4-3-5-7-10/h3-7,9H,8H2,1-2H3 Key: MFOUDYKPLGXPGO-UHFFFAOYSA-N; InChI=1/C11H14ClNO/c1-9(2)13(11(14)8-12)10-6-4-3-5-7-10/h3-7,9H,8H2,1-2H3 Key: MFOUDYKPLGXPGO-UHFFFAOYAZ
- SMILES: CC(C)N(c1ccccc1)C(=O)CCl

Properties
Chemical formula	C_{11}H_{14}ClNO
Molar mass	211.69 g·mol^{−1}
Appearance	light tan solid
Density	1.139 g/mL
- Except where otherwise noted, data are given for materials in their standard state (at 25 °C [77 °F], 100 kPa). Infobox references

Propachlor (2-chloro-N-isopropylacetanilide) is an anilide used primarily as an herbicide first marketed by Monsanto under the tradename Ramrod. It was initially registered for use in the United States in 1964.

The preparation acts on annual grasses and on some broadleaf weeds and was briefly sold in the UK as a germination inhibitor under the name Murphy Covershield. Propachlor was sold in flake, pelletized, and concentrated liquid formulations, which contained Propachlor as the main ingredient, or as a mixture with Atrazine or Propazine. Propazine-only formulations typically included instructions for mixing with Atrazine.

Between 1987 and 1996, about 2.1 million pounds of its active ingredient were used in the United States. 75% was applied to sorghum crops and 24% to maize.

Monsanto voluntarily discontinued its manufacture in 1998. It is currently listed in the U.S. Environmental Protection Agency's Toxics Release Inventory. In 2008, the European Commission issued a decision withdrawing its approval for use as of March 18, 2009, citing the presence of its metabolites in groundwater. Propachlor was added to California's Proposition 65 list as a carcinogen in 2001.

== Current manufacturers ==
It is currently being produced by Makhteshim Agan Group and Shenzhen Qinfeng Pesticides Co., Ltd.
