= Pesticide poisoning =

Poisoning of humans from pesticide exposure

Pesticide toxicity
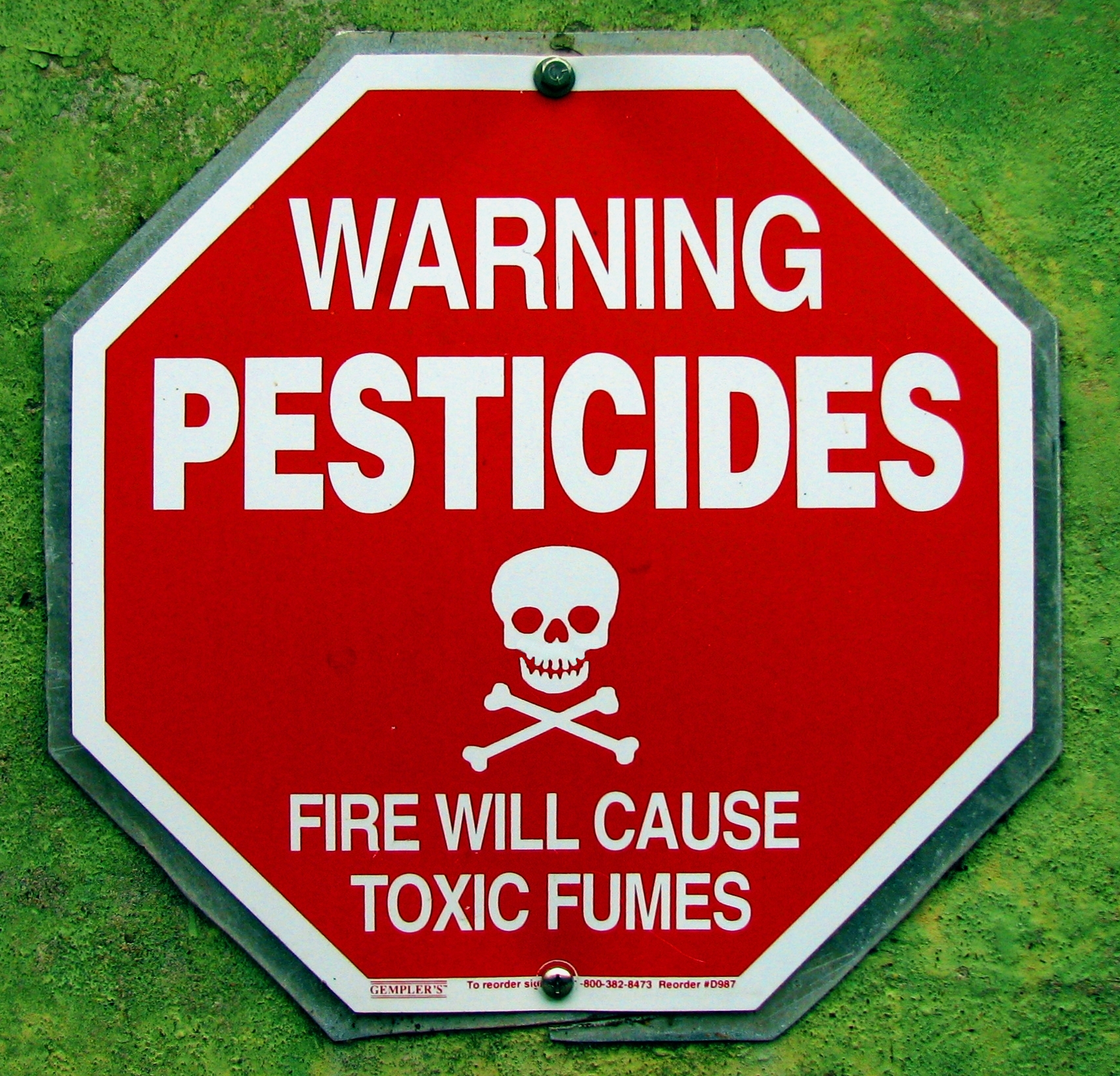
- A sign warning about potential pesticide exposure
- Specialty: Emergency medicine, toxicology

A pesticide poisoning occurs when pesticides, chemicals intended to control a pest, affect non-target organisms such as humans, wildlife, plants, or bees. There are three types of pesticide poisoning. The first of the three is a single and short-term very high level of exposure which can be experienced by individuals who die by suicide, as well as pesticide formulators. The second type of poisoning is long-term high-level exposure, which can occur in pesticide formulators and manufacturers. The third type of poisoning is a long-term low-level exposure, which individuals are exposed to from sources such as pesticide residues in food as well as contact with pesticide residues in the air, water, soil, sediment, food materials, plants and animals.

In developing countries, such as Sri Lanka, pesticide poisonings from short-term very high level of exposure (acute poisoning) is the most worrisome type of poisoning. However, in developed countries, such as Canada, it is the complete opposite: acute pesticide poisoning is controlled, thus making the main issue long-term low-level exposure of pesticides.

== Cause ==
The most common exposure scenarios for pesticide-poisoning cases are accidental or suicidal poisonings, occupational exposure, by-stander exposure to off-target drift, and the general public who are exposed through environmental contamination.

=== Accidental and Suicidal ===
Share of suicide deaths from pesticide poisoning

Self-poisoning with agricultural pesticides represents a major hidden public health problem accounting for approximately one-third of all suicides worldwide. It is one of the most common forms of self-injury in the Global South. The World Health Organization estimates that 300,000 people die from self-harm each year in the Asia-Pacific region alone. Most cases of intentional pesticide poisoning appear to be impulsive acts undertaken during stressful events, and the availability of pesticides strongly influences the incidence of self poisoning. Pesticides are the agents most frequently used by farmers and students in India to commit suicide. The overall case fatality rate for suicide attempts using pesticide is about 10–20%.

=== Occupational ===
Pesticide poisoning is an important occupational health issue because pesticides are used in a large number of industries, which puts many different categories of workers at risk. Extensive use puts agricultural workers in particular at increased risk for pesticide illnesses. Exposure can occur through inhalation of pesticide fumes, and often occurs in settings including greenhouse spraying operations and other closed environments like tractor cabs or while operating rotary fan mist sprayers in facilities or locations with poor ventilation systems. Workers in other industries are at risk for exposure as well. For example, commercial availability of pesticides in stores puts retail workers at risk for exposure and illness when they handle pesticide products. The ubiquity of pesticides puts emergency responders such as fire-fighters and police officers at risk, because they are often the first responders to emergency events and may be unaware of the presence of a poisoning hazard. The process of aircraft disinsection, in which pesticides are used on inbound international flights for insect and disease control, can also make flight attendants sick.

Different job functions can lead to different levels of exposure. Most occupational exposures are caused by absorption through exposed skin such as the face, hands, forearms, neck, and chest. This exposure is sometimes enhanced by inhalation in settings including spraying operations in greenhouses and other closed environments, tractor cabs, and the operation of rotary fan mist sprayers.

=== Residential ===
The majority of households in Canada use pesticides while taking part in activities such as gardening. In Canada, 96 percent of households report having a lawn or a garden. 56 percent of the households who have a lawn or a garden utilize fertilizer or pesticide. This form of pesticide use may contribute to the third type of poisoning, which is caused by long-term low-level exposure. As mentioned before, long-term low-level exposure affects individuals from sources such as pesticide residues in food as well as contact with pesticide residues in the air, water, soil, sediment, food materials, plants and animals.

== Pathophysiology ==
=== Organochlorines ===
DDT, an organochlorine

The organochlorine pesticides, like DDT, aldrin, and dieldrin, are extremely persistent and accumulate in fatty tissue. Through the process of bioaccumulation (lower amounts in the environment get magnified sequentially up the food chain), large amounts of organochlorines can accumulate in top species like humans. There is substantial evidence to suggest that DDT, and its metabolite DDE, act as endocrine disruptors, interfering with hormonal function of estrogen, testosterone, and other steroid hormones.

=== Anticholinesterase compounds ===
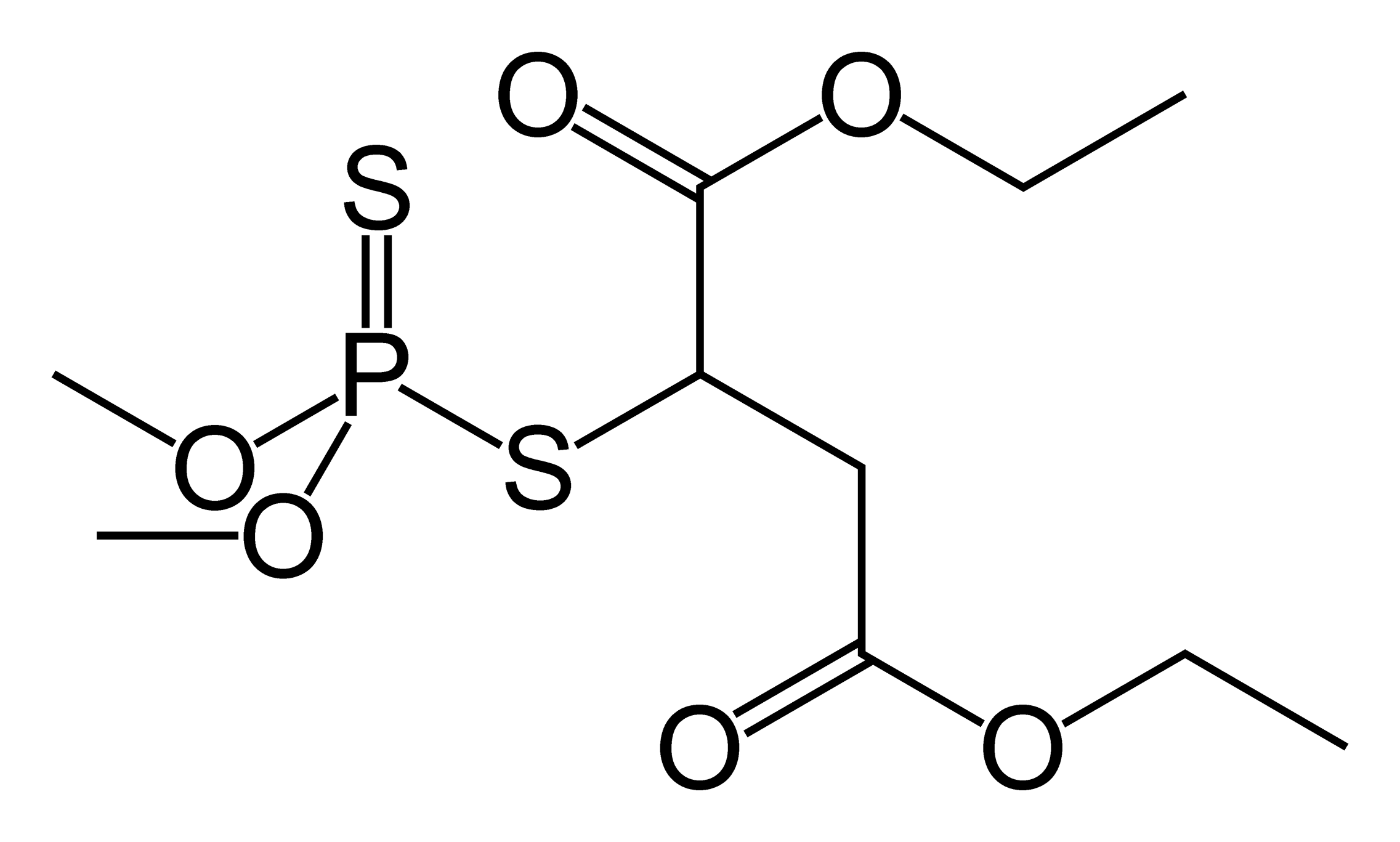
Malathion, an organophosphate anticholinesterase

Cholinesterase-inhibiting pesticides, also known as organophosphates, carbamates, and anticholinesterases, are most commonly reported in occupationally related pesticide poisonings globally. Besides acute symptoms including cholinergic crisis, certain organophosphates have long been known to cause a delayed-onset toxicity to nerve cells, which is often irreversible. Several studies have shown persistent deficits in cognitive function in workers chronically exposed to pesticides.

== Diagnosis ==
Most pesticide-related illnesses have signs and symptoms that are similar to common medical conditions, so a complete and detailed environmental and occupational history is essential for correctly diagnosing a pesticide poisoning. A few additional screening questions about the patient's work and home environment, in addition to a typical health questionnaire, can indicate whether there was a potential pesticide poisoning.

If one is regularly using carbamate and organophosphate pesticides, it is important to obtain a baseline cholinesterase test. Cholinesterase is an important enzyme of the nervous system, and these chemical groups kill pests and potentially injure or kill humans by inhibiting cholinesterase. If one has had a baseline test and later suspects a poisoning, one can identify the extent of the problem by comparison of the current cholinesterase level with the baseline level.

== Prevention ==
Accidental poisonings can be avoided by proper labeling and storage of containers. When handling or applying pesticides, exposure can be significantly reduced by protecting certain parts of the body where the skin shows increased absorption, such as the scrotal region, underarms, face, scalp, and hands. Safety protocols to reduce exposure include the use of personal protective equipment, washing hands and exposed skin during as well as after work, changing clothes between work shifts, and having first aid trainings and protocols in place for workers.

Personal protective equipment for preventing pesticide exposure includes the use of a respirator, goggles, and protective clothing, which have all have been shown to reduce risk of developing pesticide-induced diseases when handling pesticides. A study found the risk of acute pesticide poisoning was reduced by 55% in farmers who adopted extra personal protective measures and were educated about both protective equipment and pesticide exposure risk. Exposure can be significantly reduced when handling or applying pesticides by protecting certain parts of the body where the skin shows increased absorption, such as the scrotal region, underarms, face, scalp, and hands. Using chemical-resistant gloves has been shown to reduce contamination by 33–86%.

Use of genetically modified crops led to significant reduction of pesticide poisoning as these require significantly less pesticide application. In India alone, a reduction of 2.4–9 million cases per year was observed after widespread adoption of Bt cotton, with similar reductions reported in China, Pakistan and other countries.

== Treatment ==
Specific treatments for acute pesticide poisoning are often dependent on the pesticide or class of pesticide responsible for the poisoning. However, there are basic management techniques that are applicable to most acute poisonings, including skin decontamination, airway protection, gastrointestinal decontamination, and seizure treatment.

Decontamination of the skin is performed while other life-saving measures are taking place. Clothing is removed, the patient is showered with soap and water, and the hair is shampooed to remove chemicals from the skin and hair. The eyes are flushed with water for 10–15 minutes. The patient is intubated and oxygen administered, if necessary. In more severe cases, pulmonary ventilation must sometimes be supported mechanically. (Note: Specific pesticides have special considerations with regard to respiratory support. In anticholinesterase poisoning, adequate tissue oxygenation is essential before administering atropine. In paraquat and diquat poisoning, however, oxygen is contraindicated.) Seizures are typically managed with lorazepam, phenytoin and phenobarbitol, or diazepam (particularly for organochlorine poisonings).

Gastric lavage is not recommended to be used routinely in pesticide poisoning management, as clinical benefit has not been confirmed in controlled studies; it is indicated only when the patient has ingested a potentially life-threatening amount of poison and presents within 60 minutes of ingestion. An orogastric tube is inserted and the stomach is flushed with saline to try to remove the poison. If the patient is neurologically impaired, a cuffed endotracheal tube inserted beforehand for airway protection. Studies of poison recovery at 60 minutes have shown recovery of 8–32%. However, there is also evidence that lavage may flush the material into the small intestine, increasing absorption. Lavage is contra-indicated in cases of hydrocarbon ingestion.

Activated charcoal is sometimes administered as it has been shown to be successful with some pesticides but its not effective for malathion poisoning. Studies have shown that it can reduce the amount absorbed if given within 60 minutes, though there is not enough data to determine if it is effective if time from ingestion is prolonged. Syrup of ipecac is not recommended for most pesticide poisonings because of potential interference with other antidotes and regurgitation increasing exposure of the esophagus and oral area to the pesticide.

Urinary alkalinisation has been used in acute poisonings from chlorophenoxy herbicides (such as 2,4-D, MCPA, 2,4,5-T and mecoprop); however, evidence to support its use is poor.

== Epidemiology ==
Acute pesticide poisoning is a large-scale problem, especially in developing countries.

"Most estimates concerning the extent of acute pesticide poisoning have been based on data from hospital admissions which would include only the more serious cases. The latest estimate by a WHO task group indicates that there may be 1 million serious unintentional poisonings each year and in addition 2 million people hospitalized for suicide attempts with pesticides. This necessarily reflects only a fraction of the real problem. On the basis of a survey of self-reported minor poisoning carried out in the Asian region, it is estimated that there could be as many as 25 million agricultural workers in the developing world suffering an episode of poisoning each year." In Canada in 2007 more than 6000 cases of acute pesticide poisoning occurred.

Estimating the numbers of chronic poisonings worldwide is more difficult.

== Long term effects of pesticide poisonings ==
Pesticides contain many toxic chemicals that affect farmers for many years. Farm workers are impacted greatly and though they get treatment once they are exposed they have to deal with other health issues even years after the incident. The long term effects of pesticide exposure are birth defects, miscarriages, infertility in both men and women, neurological diseases such as Parkinson's disease, amyotrophic lateral sclerosis (ALS), and dementia-like diseases. And another long-term effect is different types of cancers such as lung cancer, prostate cancer, stomach cancer, breast cancer, and kidney cancer. Farmers and everyone in surrounding areas of pesticide poisoning are exposed and at risk of all the long term effects. The neurotoxicity of certain pesticides has been implicated as a potential contributing factor to the development of neurodegenerative diseases, raising concerns about their long-term impact on human health.

== Effects on children ==
Children are proven to be more susceptible to developmental poisons from pesticides than adults. Additionally risking greater sensitivity to pesticides from compounding stressors or other environmental factors. Small pesticide exposures have been shown to have an impact on young children's neurological and behavioral development. Researchers have studied the effects of pesticides on children as opposed to adults, finding children's immature organs and bodies are more susceptible to health effects. As a result, it is more difficult for children to break down and remove pesticide metabolites. Pesticide metabolites present in children can further negatively impact their health through their ability to hinder the bodies' ability to absorb vital nutrients from food.

== Society and culture ==
Rachel Carson's 1962 environmental science book Silent Spring brought about the first major wave of public concern over the chronic effects of pesticides.

Those who reside close to agriculture land are negatively impacted by pesticide drifting. This occurs when the pesticide chemicals travel to near by areas leading to exposure to highly toxic airborne chemicals. Pesticide drift is not an isolated occurrence and it happens routinely to those working in the fields and farm-working neighborhoods that reside close to industrial farming.

== Other animals ==
An obvious side effect of using a chemical meant to kill is that one is likely to kill more than just the desired organism. Contact with a sprayed plant or "weed" can have an effect upon local wildlife, most notably insects. A cause for concern is how pests, the reason for pesticide use, are building up a resistance. Phytophagous insects are able to build up this resistance because they are easily capable of evolutionary diversification and adaptation. The problem this presents is that in order to obtain the same desired effect of the pesticides they have to be made increasingly stronger as time goes on. Repercussions of the use of stronger pesticides on vegetation has a negative result on the surrounding environment, but also would contribute to consumers' long-term low-level exposure.

== See also ==
- Health effects of pesticides
- SENSOR-Pesticides program
- WHO Pesticide Evaluation Scheme
