= Health effects of pesticides =

How pesticides affect human health

Pesticide toxicity
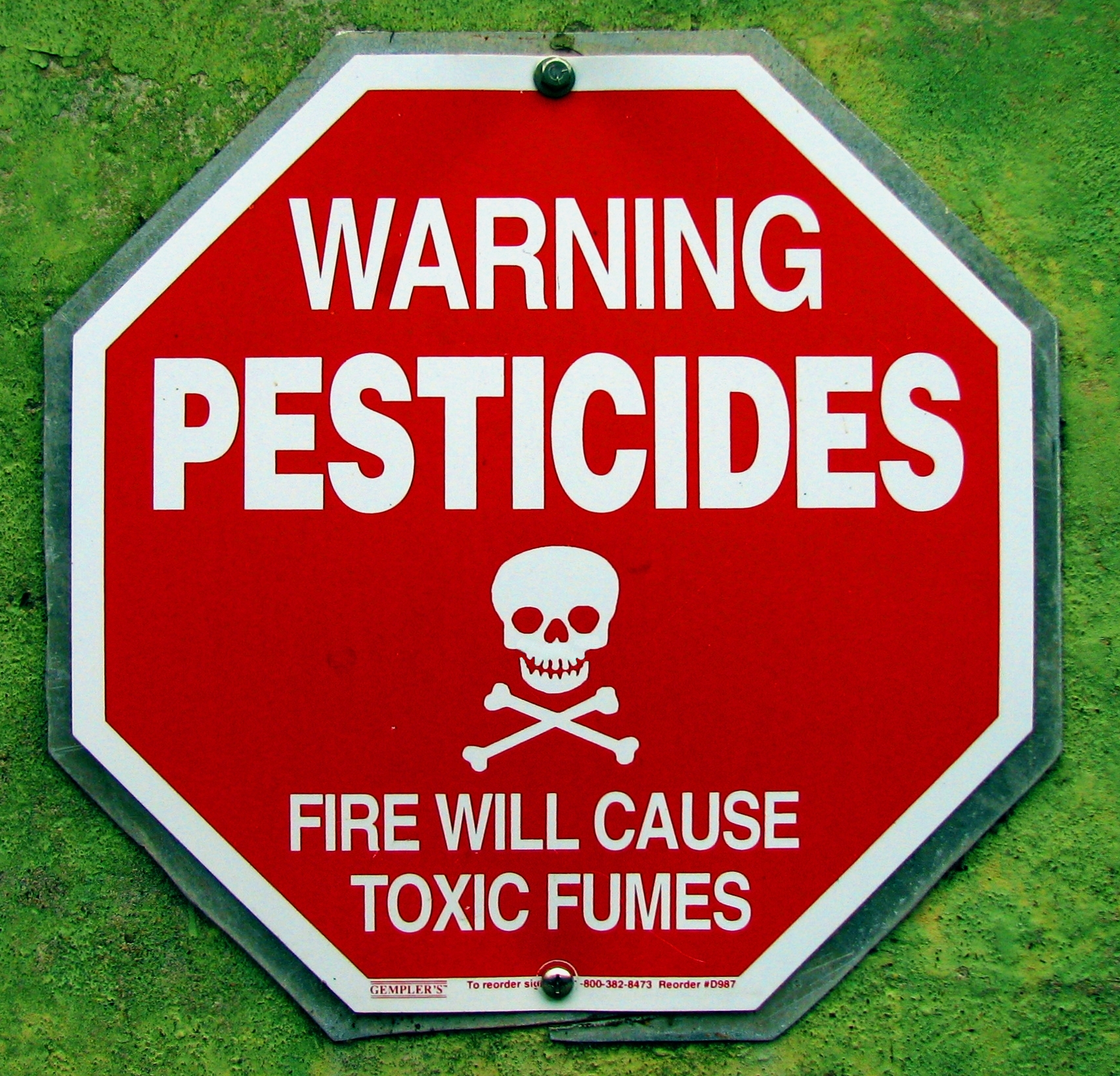
- A sign warning about potential pesticide exposure
- Specialty: Emergency medicine, toxicology

Health effects of pesticides may be acute or delayed in those who are exposed. Acute effects can include pesticide poisoning, which may be a medical emergency. Strong evidence exists for other, long-term negative health outcomes from pesticide exposure including birth defects, fetal death, neurodevelopmental disorders, cancer, and neurologic illness including Parkinson's disease. Toxicity of pesticides depend on the type of chemical, route of exposure, dosage, and timing of exposure.

According to The Stockholm Convention on Persistent Organic Pollutants (2001), 9 of the 12 most dangerous and persistent chemicals were pesticides, so many have now been withdrawn from use.

== Route of exposure ==
People can be exposed to pesticides, which include insecticides, herbicides, fungicides, by a number of different routes including: occupation, in the home, at school, in the air, water, soil, and in food. Almost all humans are exposed to some level of pesticides. For example, pesticide drift, may be a potentially significant source of exposure to the general public. Exposure can occur via ingestion, inhalation, or contact with skin. Some pesticides can remain in the environment for prolonged periods of time.

There are concerns that pesticides used to control pests on food crops are dangerous to people who consume those foods. Many food crops, including fruits and vegetables, contain pesticide residues even after being washed or peeled. Chemicals that are no longer used but that are resistant to breakdown for long periods may remain in soil and water and, thus, in food. For example, most people in the United States still have detectable levels of dichlorodiphenyltrichloroethane (DDT), an insecticide, despite its ban in the US in 1972. These concerns are one reason for the organic food movement. In California, 92% of farmworkers are Latino and exposure to pesticides in majority-Latino counties of the state to pesticides is 906% higher than counties in which the Latino population is fewer than 24%. This has raised concerns over environmental justice.

Because of the common use of pesticides in agriculture, the United Nations Codex Alimentarius Commission has recommended international standards for maximum residue limits (MRLs), for individual pesticides in food. In the United States, levels of residues permitted to remain on foods are limited based on tolerance levels considered to be safe as established by the U.S. Environmental Protection Agency (EPA). The EPA sets the permitted levels of pesticide residues based on the toxicity of the pesticide, its breakdown products, the amount and frequency of pesticide application, and how much of the pesticide (i.e. the residue) remains in or on food by the time it is marketed and distributed. Tolerance levels are obtained using scientific risk assessments that pesticide manufacturers are required to conduct—assessments include toxicological studies, exposure modeling and residue studies before a particular pesticide can be registered. However, the effects are tested a single pesticide at a time and there is little information on the possible synergistic effects of exposure to multiple pesticide traces in the air, food and water on human health.

While pesticide use is commonly associated with agriculture, pesticides are also used as part of public health interventions to control vector-borne diseases (e.g. malaria and Dengue fever) and unwanted plants in the landscaping of parks and gardens.

== Mechanism of action ==
Pesticides are designed to kill living organisms and vary in their mechanisms of action, depending on their class. The major classes of pesticides are organochlorines (OCs) or persistent organic pollutants (POPs), organophosphates, carbamates, phyrethroids, and triazines. While all pesticides have been shown to have effects on human health, OCPs are notable for significant risk for adverse effects as they dissolve in fatty tissues and can, thus, accumulate to harmful levels in these tissues. For example, some OCPs are structurally similar to estrogen and can mimic the effects of endogenous estrogen via binding to the estrogen receptors. These pesticides exhibit their toxic effects by interfering with hormonal homeostasis, resulting in hormonal dysregulation. This promotes abnormal growth and development of reproductive tissues and can lead to cancer or harmful effects on reproductive health. OCPs or POPs, which were used in agricultural practices in the 1950s, have now been banned in most countries. However, their breakdown products are persistent and can still be found in soil.

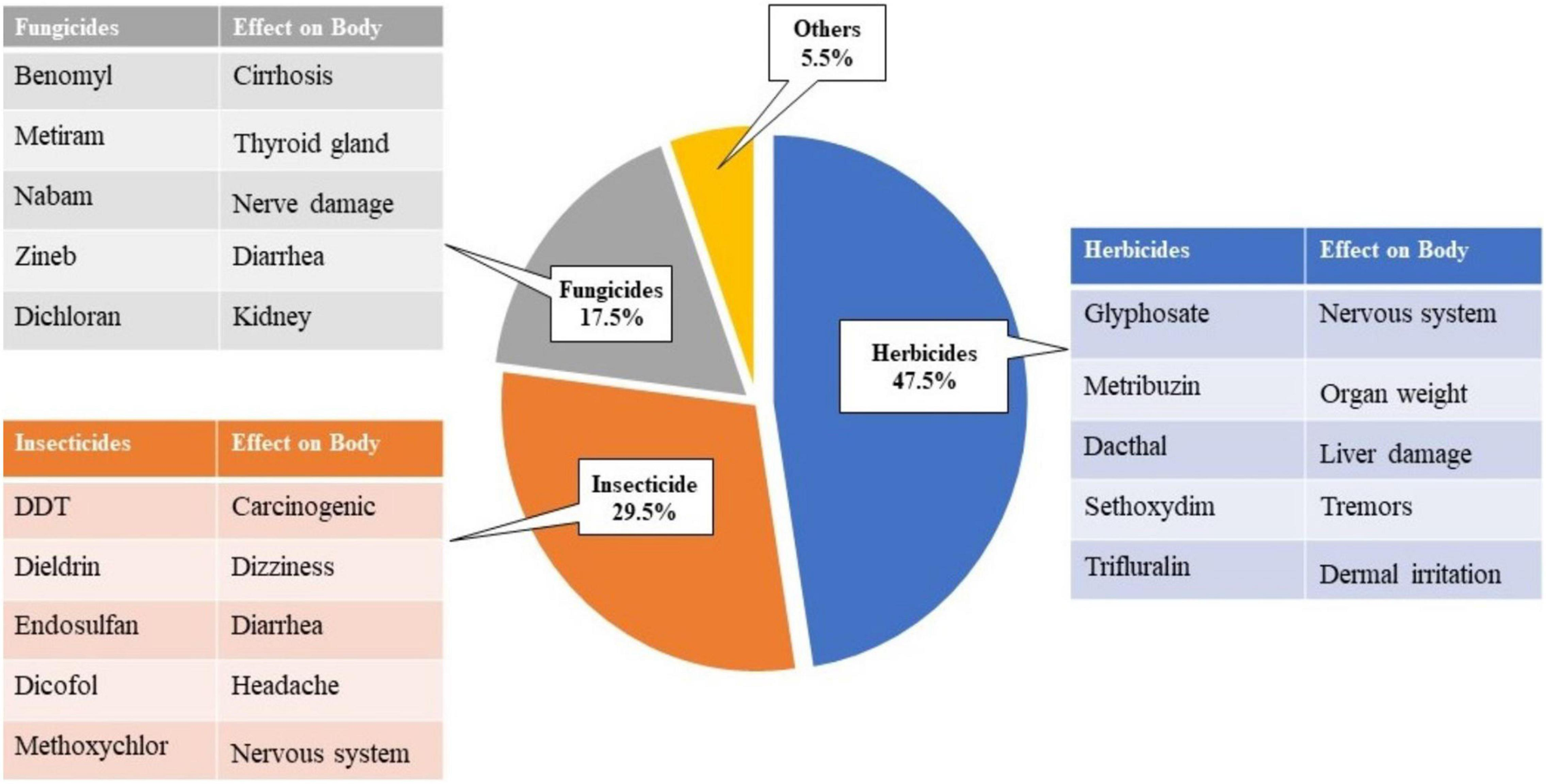
Breakdown of types of pesticides and their effects on the body

Pesticides can also exert their adverse effects on human health by acting on cell receptors and ion channels, suppressing key signal pathways in cells, and by affecting DNA methylation and histone modifications, thus resulting in changes in gene expression and cellular function.

== Acute effects ==
Acute health problems tend to be prevalent in workers who handle pesticides, especially in agricultural activity. Common health issues are abdominal pain, dizziness, headaches, nausea, vomiting, and skin and eye conditions. Dizziness is a common acute problem caused by organophosphates and pyrethroids, due to the inhibition of an enzyme that aids the central nervous system (Potential Health Effects of Pesticides). (). Penn State, </ref> In China, an estimated half-million people are poisoned by pesticides each year, 500 of whom die. Pyrethrins, insecticides commonly used in common bug killers, can cause a potentially deadly condition if breathed in.

== Long-term effects ==
=== Cancer ===
Pesticide residues on food do not cause cancer. Some medical research has suggested glyphosate exposure may cause cancer, but there is no good evidence of this, even with high-level exposure.

Agricultural workers exposed to high levels of synthetic pesiticide have an increased prevalence of some cancers (including lymphoma and prostate cancer), and a decreased prevalence of others.

=== Neurological ===
A review of multiple studies that looked at high pesticide exposure, mainly organophosphates, among agricultural workers suggested an association with various neurological disorders, but the evidence was weak.

The United States Environmental Protection Agency finished a 10-year review of the organophosphate pesticides following the 1996 Food Quality Protection Act, but did little to account for developmental neurotoxic effects, drawing strong criticism from within the agency and from outside researchers. Comparable studies have not been done with newer pesticides that are replacing organophosphates.

==== In-utero and early-childhood exposure ====
There is accumulating evidence of neurological effects secondary to pesticide exposure. Acute exposure to high levels of pesticides that affect the central nervous system can cause neurotoxicity, including cognitive and motor changes. In-utero and early-childhood exposure to organophosphates can cause neurodevelopmental impairment, in particular because some pesticides and their metabolites cross the placenta and fetal blood-brain-barrier, which has not fully developed in a fetus.

==== Parkinson's disease and Alzheimer's disease ====
An accumulation of chronic exposure has been associated with an increased risk of developing neurodegenerative disease later in life. There is strong evidence that chronic exposure to pesticides increases risk of developing Parkinson's disease, potentially through direct toxic effects on dopaminergic neurons (which are depleted in Parkinson's disease). A review paper implicated several pesticides in Parkinson's disease, including rotenone, PQ (paraquat), MB (methyl benzoate), organochlorines and pyrethroids. In addition, there is increasing evidence that chronic exposure increases risk of Alzheimer's disease.

==== Autism and ADHD ====
There is some suggestive research, but no good evidence, potentially linking pesticide exposure with autism and ADHD. Organochlorines specifically have been linked with autism. Furthermore, it is thought that early disruptions to the gut microbiome caused by pesticides can lead to symptoms of autism.

=== Reproductive effects ===
Many pesticides act as endocrine-disrupting chemicals (EDC) or substances that interfere with normal hormonal activity. As of 2013, 101 pesticides have been listed as proven or possible endocrine disruptors. As such, high levels of and/or long-term exposure to pesticides can impact reproductive health and is associated with decreased fertility, increased rates of miscarriage, and changes in pattern of maturity. Specifically, triazines, organs-chlorine, and carbamate insecticides have anti-androgenic effects impacting males, resulting in the lack of development of male characteristics including decreases in testicular size, sperm production, and androgen production. A number of pesticides including dibromochlorophane and 2,4-D has been associated with impaired fertility in males. Pesticide exposure resulted in reduced fertility in males, genetic alterations in sperm, a reduced number of sperm, damage to germinal epithelium and altered hormone function.

The effects of endocrine disruption is dependent on the timing of pesticide exposure (for example, during embryogenesis in early pregnancy or in infancy) as windows of varying susceptibility dictate disease manifestation. Several studies suggest that higher levels of pesticides in the blood of the mother is associated with longer time to pregnancy and greater infertility rates. For example, in mothers and/or their partners who reported pesticide exposure, there was an increased risk of miscarriage with the strongest association with exposure during the first three weeks of pregnancy. This is perhaps linked to the possible negative impact of pesticides on oocyte development and fertilization. Similarly, studies evaluating the short-term impact of occupational exposure to a variety of pesticides on reproductive health suggest that pesticides can have deleterious effects on sperm—pesticide exposure, associated with decreased sperm motility, defects in sperm morphology and semen volume. However, the long-term impacts of pesticide exposure on spermatogenesis and fertility are unknown.

=== Fetal death and birth defects ===
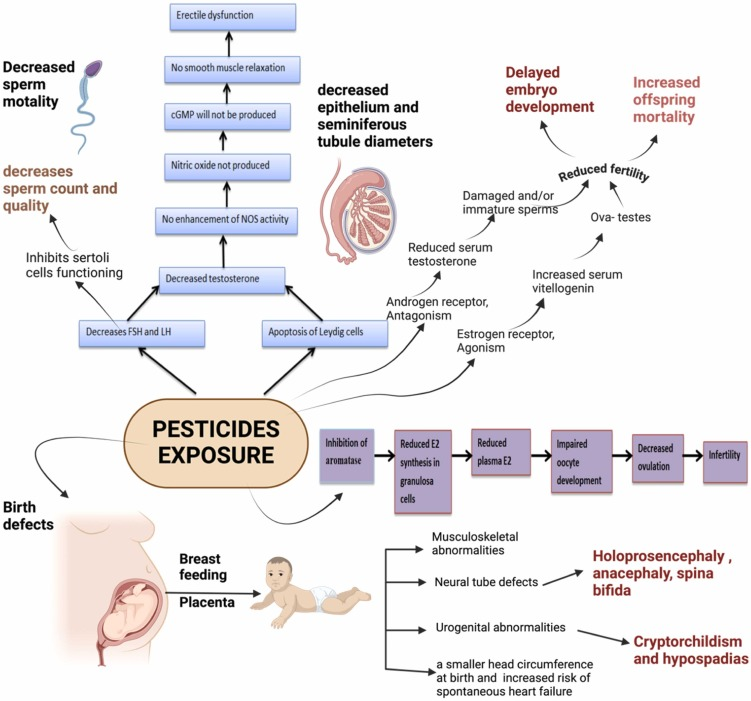
Mechanisms through which pesticide exposure effects reproductive health

Because some pesticides and their resulting metabolites can cross the placenta and, therefore, the blood-brain-barrier, they can also impact development of the fetus; strong evidence links pre- and post-natal exposures to pesticides to congenital disorders, including physical and/or mental disabilities, fetal death and altered fetal growth. Perhaps the more widely known health effect of pesticides is the elevated rate of birth defects in areas in Vietnam sprayed with defoliant or Agent Orange, a 50:50 mixture of 2,4,5-T and 2,4-D, which has been associated with bad health and genetic effects in Malaya and Vietnam. It was also found that offspring who were at some point exposed to pesticides had a low birth weight and had developmental defects. Maternal exposure to pesticides has also been linked to higher incidence of hypospadias in the newborn, which is the abnormal opening of the urethra in males.

=== Respiratory problems ===
Studies have indicated that pesticide exposure is associated with long-term respiratory problems. A significant association was found between exposure to pesticides and decreased lung function along with related airway symptoms. Studies have suggested an association between exposure to pesticides and airway symptoms such as wheezing, cough, shortness of breath, runny nose, sore or irritation of throat, and difficulty breathing. Decreased lung function was associated with occupational exposure to pesticides. Studies have suggested a correlation between inhibition of cholinesterase by pesticides like carbamate and organophosphate and reduction or impairment of lung function. In addition, exposure to pesticides was also reported to be linked with obstructive and restrictive lung conditions. Specifically, organophosphate exposure was associated with lung function decline driven by a restrictive process.

=== Other ===
Some studies have found increased risks of dermatitis in those exposed.

There is increasing evidence that possibly suggests increased risk of development of type 2 diabetes with exposure to pesticides and their metabolites.

== Prevention ==
Pesticides exposure cannot be studied in placebo controlled trials as this would be unethical. A definitive cause effect relationship therefore cannot be established. Consistent evidence can and has been gathered through other study designs. The precautionary principle is thus frequently used in environmental law such that absolute proof is not required before efforts to decrease exposure to potential toxins are enacted.

The American Medical Association recommend limiting exposure to pesticides. They came to this conclusion due to the fact that surveillance systems currently in place are inadequate to determine problems related to exposure. The utility of applicator certification and public notification programs are also of unknown value in their ability to prevent adverse outcomes.

== Epidemiology ==
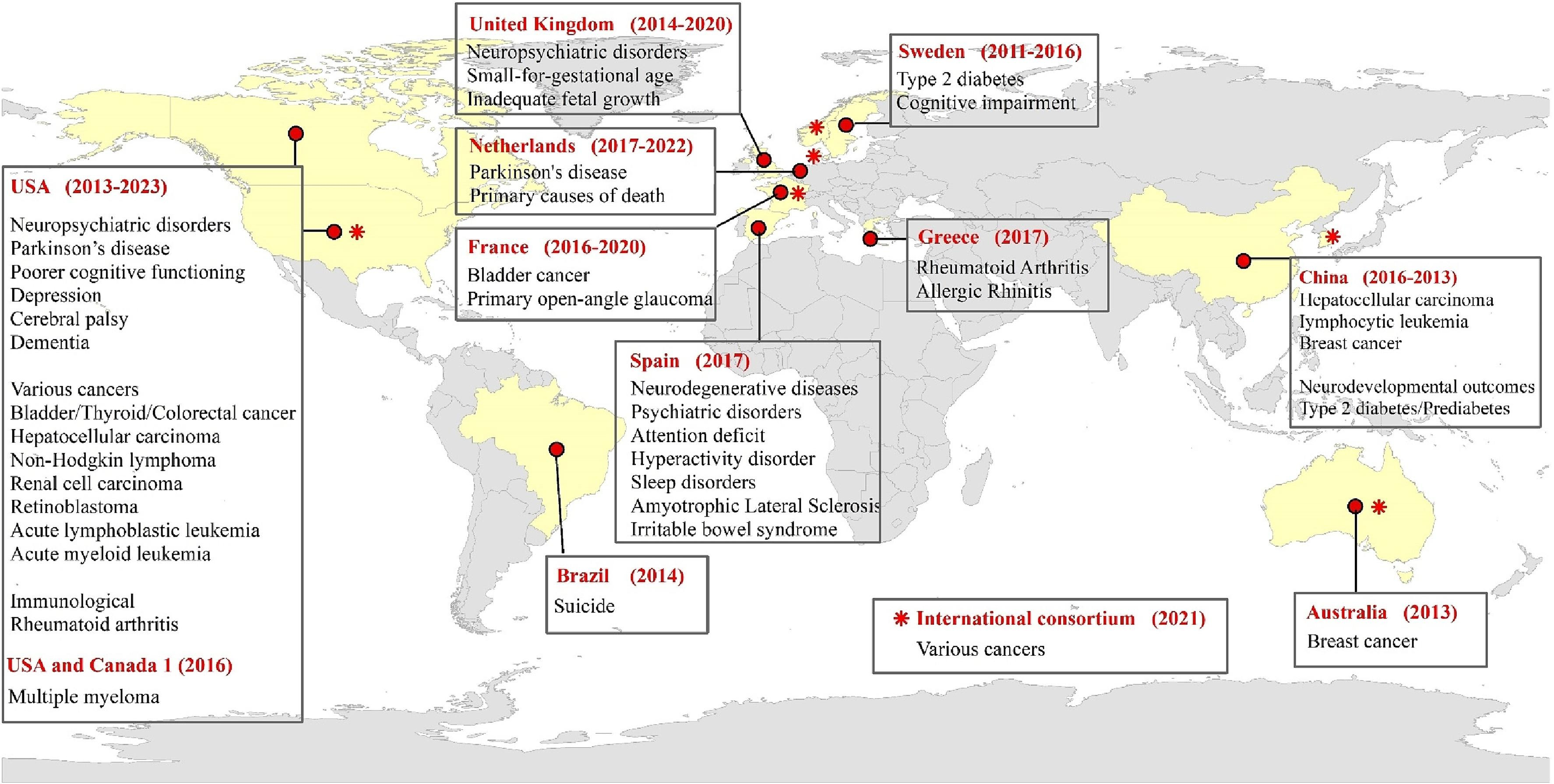
Map of pesticide effects on human health based on literature

The World Health Organization and the UN Environment Programme estimate that each year, 3 million workers in agriculture in the developing world experience severe poisoning from pesticides, about 18,000 of whom die. According to one study, as many as 25 million workers in developing countries may suffer mild pesticide poisoning yearly. Detectable levels of 50 different pesticides were found in the blood of a representative sample of the U.S. population.

=== Research conflicts of interest ===
Concerns regarding conflict of interests regarding the research base have been raised for some research into toxicity of pesticides. For example, Richard Doll of the Imperial Cancer Research Fund in England was found to have undisclosed ties to industry funding.

== Other animals ==
A number of pesticides including the neonicotinoids clothianidin, dinotefuran, imidacloprid are toxic to bees. Exposure to pesticides may be one of the contributory factors to colony collapse disorder. A study in North Carolina indicated that more than 30 percent of the quail tested were made sick by one aerial insecticide application. Once sick, wild birds may neglect their young, abandon their nests, and become more susceptible to predators or disease.

== See also ==
- Environmental effects of pesticides
- Paraquat
- Chlorpyrifos
