= Pesticide residue =

Pesticides remaining in food after application

Pesticide residue refers to the pesticides that may remain on or in food, after they are applied to food crops. The maximum allowable levels of these residues in foods are stipulated by regulatory bodies in many countries. Regulations such as pre-harvest intervals also prevent harvest of crop or livestock products if recently treated in order to allow residue concentrations to decrease over time to safe levels before harvest.

== Definition ==
A pesticide is a substance or a mixture of substances used for killing pests: organisms dangerous to cultivated plants or to animals. The term applies to various pesticides such as insecticides, fungicides, herbicides and nematocides.

The definition of residue of pesticide according to the World Health Organization (WHO) is:

Any specified substances in or on food, agricultural commodities or animal feed resulting from the use of a pesticide. The term includes any derivatives of a pesticide, such as conversion products, metabolites, reaction products and impurities considered to be of toxicological significance. The term “pesticide residue” includes residues from unknown or unavoidable sources (e.g. environmental) as well as known uses of the chemical. The definition of a residue for compliance with maximum residue limits (MRLs) is that combination of the pesticide and its metabolites, derivatives and related compounds to which the MRL applies.

== Background ==
Prior to 1940, pesticides consisted of inorganic compounds (copper, arsenic, mercury, and lead) and plant derived products. Most of these were abandoned because they were highly toxic and ineffective. Since World War II pesticides composed of synthetic organic compounds were the most important form of pest control. The growth in these pesticides accelerated in late 1940s after Paul Müller discovered DDT in 1939. The effects of pesticides such as aldrin, dieldrin, endrin, chlordane, parathion, captan and 2,4-D were also found at this time. Those pesticides were widely used due to their effective pest control. Problems with environmental issues of DDT became increasingly apparent, since it is persistent and bioaccumulates in the body and the food chain. In the 1960s, Rachel Carson wrote Silent Spring to illustrate a risk of DDT and how it threatened biodiversity. DDT was banned for agricultural use in 1972 and the others in 2001. Persistent pesticides are no longer used for agriculture, and will not be approved by the authorities. Because the half life in soil is long (for DDT 2–15 years) residues can still be detected in humans at levels 5 to 10 times lower than found in the 1970s.

== Regulations ==
Each country adopts their own agricultural policies and Maximum Residue Limits (MRL) and Acceptable Daily Intake (ADI). The level of food additive usage varies by country because forms of agriculture are different in regions according to their geographical or climatical factors.

Pre-harvest intervals are also set to require a crop or livestock product not be harvested before a certain period after application in order to allow the pesticide residue to decrease below maximum residue limits or other tolerance levels. Likewise, restricted entry intervals are the amount of time to allow residue concentrations to decrease before a worker can reenter without protective equipment an area where pesticides have been applied.

=== International ===
Some countries use the International Maximum Residue Limits -Codex Alimentarius to define the residue limits; this was established by Food and Agriculture Organization of the United Nations (FAO) and World Health Organization (WHO) in 1963 to develop international food standards, guidelines codes of practices, and recommendation for food safety. Currently the CODEX has 185 Member Countries and 1 member organization (EU).

The following is the list of maximum residue limits (MRLs) for spices adopted by the commission.

Pesticide	Group or sub-group of spices	MRL (mg/kg)
Acephate	Entire Group 028	0.2
Azinphos-methyl	Entire Group 028	0.5
Chlorpyrifos	Seeds; Fruits or berries Roots or rhizomes	5; 1; 1
Chlorpyrifos-methyl	Seeds; Fruits or berries Roots or rhizomes	1; 0.3; 5
Cypermethrin	Fruits or berries Roots or rhizomes	0.1; 0.2
Diazinon	Seeds; Fruits; Roots or rhizomes	5; 0.1; 0.5
Dichlorvos	Entire Group 028	0.1
Dicofol	Seeds; Fruits or berries Roots or rhizomes	0.05; 0.1; 0.1
Dimethoate	Seeds; Fruits or berries Roots or rhizomes	5; 0.5; 0.1
Disulfoton	Entire Group 028	0.05
Endosulfan	Seeds; Fruits or berries Roots or rhizomes	1; 5; 0.5
Ethion	Seeds; Fruits or berries Roots or rhizomes	3; 5; 0.3
Fenitrothion	Seeds; Fruits or berries Roots or rhizomes	7; 1; 0.1
Iprodione	Seeds; Fruits or berries Roots or rhizomes	7; 1; 0.1
Malathion	Seeds; Fruits or berries Roots or rhizomes	2; 1; 0.5
Metalaxyl	Seeds	5
Methamidophos	Entire Group 028	0.1
Parathion	Seeds; Fruits or berries Roots or rhizomes	0.1; 0.2; 0.2
Parathion-methyl	Seeds; Fruits or berries Roots or rhizomes	5; 5; 0.3
Permethrin	Entire Group 028	0.05
Phenthoate	Seeds	7
Phorate	Seeds; Fruits or berries Roots or rhizomes	0.5; 0.1; 0.1
Phosalone	Seeds; Fruits or berries Roots or rhizomes	2; 2; 3
Pirimicarb	Seeds	5
Pirimiphos-methyl	Seeds sub group Fruits sub group	3; 0.5
Quintozene	Seeds sub group Fruits or berries Roots or rhizomes	0.1; 0.02; 2
Vinclozolin	Entire spice group	0.05

=== European Union ===
The European Union has a searchable database with the Maximum Residue Limits (MRLs) for 716 pesticides. Under the previous system, revised in 2008, certain pesticide residues were regulated by the commission; others were regulated by Member States, and others were not regulated at all.

=== New Zealand ===
Food Standards Australia New Zealand develops the standards for levels of pesticide residues in foods through a consultation process. The New Zealand Food Safety Authority publishes the maximum limits of pesticide residues for foods produced in New Zealand.

=== United Kingdom ===
Monitoring of pesticide residues in the UK began in the 1950s. From 1977 to 2000 the work was carried out by the Working Party on Pesticide Residues (WPPR), until in 2000 the work was taken over by the Pesticide Residue Committee (PRC). The PRC advise the government through the Pesticides Safety Directorate and the Food Standards Agency (FSA).

=== United States ===
In the US, tolerances for the amount of pesticide residue that may remain on food are set by the EPA, and measures are taken to keep pesticide residues below the tolerances. The US EPA has a web page for the allowable tolerances. In order to assess the risks associated with pesticides on human health, the EPA analyzed individual pesticide active ingredients as well as the common toxic effect that groups of pesticides have, called the cumulative risk assessment. Limits that the EPA sets on pesticides before approving them includes a determination of how often the pesticide should be used and how it should be used, in order to protect the public and the environment. In the US, the Food and Drug Administration (FDA) and USDA also routinely check food for the actual levels of pesticide residues.

A US organic food advocacy group, the Environmental Working Group, is known for creating a list of fruits and vegetables referred to as the Dirty Dozen; it lists produce with the highest number of distinct pesticide residues or most samples with residue detected in USDA data. This list is generally considered misleading and lacks scientific credibility because it lists detections without accounting for the risk of the usually small amount of each residue with respect to consumer health. In 2016, over 99% of samples of US produce had no pesticide residue or had residue levels well below the EPA tolerance levels for each pesticide.

=== Japan ===
In Japan, pesticide residues are regulated by the Food Safety Act.

Pesticide tolerances are set by the Ministry of Health, Labour and Welfare through the Drug and Food Safety Committee. Unlisted residue amounts are restricted to 0.01ppm.

=== China ===
In China, the Ministry of Health and the Ministry of Agriculture have jointly established mechanisms and working procedures relating to maximum residue limit standards, while updating them continuously, according to the food safety law and regulations issued by the State Council. From GB25193-2010 to GB28260-2011, from Maximum Residue Limits for 12 Pesticides to 85 pesticides, they have improved the standards in response to Chinese national needs.

== Health impacts ==
The maximum residue limits of pesticides in food are low, and are carefully set by the authorities to ensure, to their best judgement, no health impacts.

According to the American Cancer Society there is no evidence that pesticide residues in food increase the risk of people getting cancer. The ACA advises washing fruit and vegetables before eating to remove both pesticide residue and other undesirable contaminants. A 2009 study estimated that lifetime exposure to pesticide residues from eating fruits and vegetables results in only 4.2 and 3.2 minutes of lost life per person in Switzerland and the United States, respectively.

There are many studies on the health differences between consumers of organic foods vs consumers of organically grown foods. When the American Academy of Pediatrics reviewed the literature on organic foods in 2012, they found that "current evidence does not support any meaningful nutritional benefits or deficits from eating organic compared with conventionally grown foods, and there are no well-powered human studies that directly demonstrate health benefits or disease protection as a result of consuming an organic diet."

=== Chinese incidents ===
In China, a number of incidents have occurred where state limits were exceeded by large amounts or where the wrong pesticide was used. In August 1994, a serious incident of pesticide poisoning of sweet potato crops occurred in Shandong province, China. Because local farmers were not fully educated in the use of insecticides, they used the highly-toxic pesticide named parathion instead of trichlorphon. It resulted in over 300 cases of poisoning and 3 deaths. Also, there was a case where a large number of students were poisoned and 23 of them were hospitalized because of vegetables that contained excessive pesticide residues.

=== Child neurodevelopment ===
Many pesticides achieve their intended use of killing pests by disrupting the nervous system. Due to similarities in brain biochemistry among many different organisms, there is much speculation that these chemicals can have a negative impact on humans as well. Children are especially vulnerable to exposure to pesticides, especially at critical windows of development. Infants and children consume higher amounts of food relative to their body-weight, and have a more permeable blood–brain barrier, all of which can contribute to increased risks from exposure to pesticide residues. However, in 2008 the OECD report that the existing guideline represents the best available science for assessing the potential for developmental neurotoxicity in human health risk assessment.

== See also ==
- Child development
- Dose–response relationship
- Environmental effects of pesticides
- Environmental issues with agriculture
- Food safety
- List of environmental issues
- Pesticide poisoning
- QuEChERS - method for testing pesticide residues
