= Ractopamine =

Animal feed additive

Names
- Preferred IUPAC name 4-(1-Hydroxy-2-{[4-(4-hydroxyphenyl)butan-2-yl]amino}ethyl)phenol

Identifiers
CAS Number	97825-25-7
3D model (JSmol)	Interactive image
ChEBI	CHEBI:82644
ChEMBL	ChEMBL509336
ChemSpider	50604
MeSH	Ractopamine
PubChem CID	56052
UNII	57370OZ3P1
CompTox Dashboard (EPA)	DTXSID7048378
- InChI: InChI=1S/C18H23NO3/c1-13(2-3-14-4-8-16(20)9-5-14)19-12-18(22)15-6-10-17(21)11-7-15/h4-11,13,18-22H,2-3,12H2,1H3 Key: YJQZYXCXBBCEAQ-UHFFFAOYSA-N; InChI=1/C18H23NO3/c1-13(2-3-14-4-8-16(20)9-5-14)19-12-18(22)15-6-10-17(21)11-7-15/h4-11,13,18-22H,2-3,12H2,1H3 Key: YJQZYXCXBBCEAQ-UHFFFAOYAP
- SMILES: OC(c1ccc(O)cc1)CNC(C)CCc2ccc(O)cc2

Properties
Chemical formula	C_{18}H_{23}NO_{3}
Molar mass	301.386 g·mol^{−1}
Solubility in water	4100 mg/L
- Except where otherwise noted, data are given for materials in their standard state (at 25 °C [77 °F], 100 kPa). verify (what is ?) Infobox references

Ractopamine (/rækˈtɒpəmaɪn, -miːn/) is an animal feed additive used to promote leanness and increase food conversion efficiency in farmed animals in few countries, banned in most. Pharmacologically, it is a phenol-based TAAR1 agonist and β adrenoreceptor agonist that stimulates β_{1} and β_{2} adrenergic receptors. It is most commonly administered to animals for meat production as ractopamine hydrochloride. It is the active ingredient in products marketed in the US as Paylean for swine, Optaflexx for cattle, and Topmax for turkeys. It was developed by Elanco Animal Health, a former division of Eli Lilly and Company.

As of 2025, the use of ractopamine "is banned or its use restricted in 168 nations", including the European Union, China and Russia, while it is legal in some other countries, with differing maximum residual limits (MRLs) in meat. Examples include the United States (50 ppb in pork, 30 ppb in beef); Japan, Taiwan and South Korea (10 ppb, in accordance with the Codex Alimentarius Commission); and New Zealand (0.1 ppb).

Commercial ractopamine is a mixture of all four possible stereoisomers. It is also a positional isomer of dobutamine, a related drug.

== Mode of action ==
When used as a food additive, ractopamine added to feed can be distributed by the blood to the muscle tissues, where it serves as a full agonist to murine (mouse or rat) TAAR1, a receptor protein (not necessarily in humans). It is also an agonist to beta-adrenergic receptors and a dopamine releasing agent. A cascade of events will then be initiated to increase protein synthesis, which results in increased muscle fiber size. Ractopamine is known to increase the rate of weight gain, improve feed efficiency, and increase carcass leanness in finishing swine. Its use in finishing swine yields about 3 kg (6.6 lb) of additional lean pork per animal, and improves feed efficiency by 10%. In cattle on 28 January 2004 Elanco Animal Health made Optaflexx commercially available in the US. Optaflexx is a "medicated feed additive that is labeled only for use in steers or market heifers (not breeding heifers or bulls) during the last 28–42 days on feed."

== Regulation around the world ==
On 6 July 2012, the international reference standard Codex Alimentarius Commission narrowly approved the adoption of a maximum residue limit (MRL) of 10 parts per billion (ppb) for muscle cuts of beef and pork. Setting any limit was a controversial move. Countries with major meat export markets had been lobbying for the establishment of such a standard for several years to use it as leverage to erode individual national-level bans in World Trade Organization disputes. Consumers International, a world federation of consumer groups that represents 220 consumer organizations in 115 countries, strongly opposed the move.

A 2020 petition to the Food and Drug Administration to reconsider the approval of ractopamine stated that 168 other nations had banned or restricted its use. In 2025 and in response to an unreasonable delay lawsuit, the FDA responded acknowledging the number had increased from 160 in 2012, and questioned the relevance of the figure.

=== European Union ===
Ractopamine has not been allowed in the European Union, based on the 2009 EU's Food Safety Authority's opinion on its safety evaluation, which concluded that available data were insufficient to derive a maximum residue limit as a 'safe residue level for human consumption'. The uncertainty was particularly great for people who might be thought to be more susceptible than most to an increase in β adrenergic stimulation from consuming the additive, such as children or people with cardiovascular disease, and that simply increasing the "uncertainty factor" built into the calculation as a safety factor would rapidly become arbitrary.

=== Canada, United States, Mexico ===
Ractopamine use as a feed additive is authorized in the United States, Canada, and Mexico. In the US, ractopamine is allowed to be used at a feed concentration of 5–20 mg/kg feed for finishing pigs and in dosages of 5–10 mg/kg feed for finishing pigs heavier than 109 kg. The maximum residue limit for ractopamine for meat in the US is 50 parts per billion (ppb), or five times the standard set by the Codex Alimentarius. Ractopamine was approved by the FDA in 1999 for use in swine, in 2003 for use in cattle, and in 2008 for use in turkeys.

In 2015, the USDA approved of a new label, "No ractopamine — a beta-agonist growth promotant" to be used.

The Canadian Food Inspection Agency (CFIA) maintains the Canadian Ractopamine-Free Pork Certification Program (CRFPCP) so that Canadian exports to Asian countries are not disallowed by their authorities. Hundreds of commercial feed facilities, including some from overseas, are enrolled in the CRFPCP, a programme that is essentially based on self-certification and backed up by a randomized testing policy.

Currently, the label for USDA organic means no synthetic compounds can be used other than those on the list of allowed synthetics; therefore, ractopamine would not be allowed in certified organic production.

For Canadian domestic consumption of non-CRFPCP pork, ractopamine hydrochloride is permitted to be sold over the counter with applications in meal or pellet feed for finishing barrows and gilts (up to 10 mg/kg for last six weeks), confined finishing cattle (up to 30 mg/kg for last 42 days), and finishing heavy turkeys (up to 9 mg/kg for 14 days). The withdrawal period was set to 0 days.

=== Japan, South Korea ===
Japan, which had permitted its feed additive use at least until 2009, and South Korea only allow import of meat with ractopamine residues up to the maximum residue limit (MRL), but do not permit its use in beef production.

=== Taiwan ===
In October 2006, Taiwan banned ractopamine along with other beta-adrenergic agonists. In a 2012 climb-down, its legislature passed amendments to its Act Governing Food Sanitation, authorising government agencies to set safety standards for ractopamine. The Taiwanese Department of Health ultimately established an MRL of 10 ppb for ractopamine in beef on 31 July 2012. The American Institute in Taiwan, which represents US interests in Taiwan, states that these "and many other countries have determined that meat from animals fed ractopamine is safe for human consumption"; this is in the context of an ongoing trade dispute between Taiwan and the US on this subject, which threatened to prevent Taiwan's entry to the Trans-Pacific Partnership trade pact.

In 2020, restrictions on imports of US pork with ractopamine were relaxed, leading to protests. A referendum took place on December 18, 2021, deciding whether to ban the import of pork with ractopamine, and the ban was rejected.

=== China, Russia ===
In 2013, Russia and China banned ractopamine in pork, and Russia also in beef, deeming it unfit for human consumption. Because the traditional Chinese diet embraces pig offal, and because ractopamine is concentrated by the gastro-intestinal system of animals, Chinese officials have banned ractopamine. Other countries in Asia, whose traditional diet is similar to that of the Chinese, have had similar concerns, but the American use of tied trade access as a proxy for conflict has somewhat mitigated their reactions.

=== New Zealand, Russia ===
In 2017, Russia banned imports of beef from New Zealand after finding ractopamine in New Zealand beef. Ractopamine is not registered for use in cattle in New Zealand.

== WADA proscription ==
In 2015, Radwa Arafa Abd Elsalam, an athlete from Egypt, underwent a doping control where ractopamine was identified in the sample. Elsalam was sanctioned by the Egyptian Anti-Doping Organisation (EGY-NADO) with a two year ineligibility period for non-intentional presence of a prohibited substance, in violation of Article 2.1 of the EGY-NADO rules. While not mentioned by name in the 2015 Prohibited List, ractopamine was determined to — much like clenbuterol, another β_{2}-adrenergic agonist — constitute an Other Anabolic Agent prohibited under S1.2. Elsalam appealed the decision, claiming that ractopamine is used in the meat industry overseas, so she must have inadvertently consumed food contaminated with ractopamine. EGY-NADO accepted her appeal, reduced the sanction to six months, and provided the World Anti-Doping Agency (WADA) with records pertaining to the case.

WADA filed an appeal with the Court of Arbitration for Sport (CAS) against EGY-NADO and Elsalam with respect to the appealed decision. WADA asserted ractopamine was "undisputed[ly]" an Other Anabolic Agent, that "[i]t is not sufficient for an athlete merely to make protestations of innocence and suggest that the prohibited substance must have entered her body in inadvertently", and that "her explanations are nothing more than mere speculation". Elsalam asserted she was not aware ractopamine was a prohibited substance, that ractopamine was commonly used overseas to increase meat yields, that she was "a normal Arabic girl", that her family consumed a large quantity of meat during Ramadan (providing a receipt "for the purchase of 20 kilos of Brazilian meat, hot dog and green sausage"), that she was not warned meat could contain prohibited substances, and that further sanctions were "unfair" and "will affect her whole life causing her depression".

CAS determined there were two key issues in dispute: Firstly, whether the presence of ractopamine in the athlete's sample constituted a violation of EGY-NADO rules; and secondly, if a violation was committed, the extent to which sanctions should be applied. On the first issue, CAS found "there can be no doubt that Ractopamine is indeed a non-specified substance falling under the category of Other Anabolic Agents" and that no evidence was submitted to suggest otherwise. On the second issue, CAS stated they could not "permit an athlete to establish how a substance came to be present in his body by little more a denial that he took it", that there was "nothing more than speculation, unsupported by any evidence of any kind", that Elsalam did not substantiate her hypothesis with any evidence aside from the receipt presented, that little attempt was made "to establish the causal link" and that it was "noteworthy" that Elsalam had not "produced a single piece of evidence demonstrating or even substantiating that other consumers (including athletes) having purchased and eating [sic] meat in Egypt within the relevant time have been subjected to food contamination with [ractopamine]"

CAS upheld WADA's appeal, ruling a violation was committed, and that Elsalam had not met her burden of proof, so the violation "must be deemed to have been intentional". It was explicitly stated that they had "not pronounced the Athlete as a 'cheater'". Elsalam's ineligibility period was extended to four years.

In October 2017 at a WADA conference, it was suggested in relation with ractopamine:

- that scientific solutions could "allow discrimination between meat contamination and pharmacological intake";
- "Information on risk of meat contamination should be continued";
- "Countries affected by meat contamination should continue their efforts, in particular sanitary measures, to reduce risks of exposure of the national and international athletic population."

One conclusion reached in October 2017 was that there was a "clear risk for athletes to be tested positive" when consuming meat with residues at the MRL concentration.

== International disputes ==
=== US-EU WTO dispute ===
In the late 1990s, the World Trade Organization authorized the United States and Canada to impose retaliatory tariffs of US$116.8 million per year on the European Union after it found the EU beef hormone ban to be in violation of the WTO Agreement on the Application of Sanitary and Phytosanitary Measures (SPS Agreement). In September 2009, the trade representatives from the US and EU signed a memorandum of understanding, which established a new duty-free import quota in the European Union for grain-fed, high-quality beef as part of a compromise solution.

=== China ===
In July 2007, officials of the People's Republic of China seized US-produced pork for containing ractopamine residues. Further shipments of Canadian ractopamine-fed pork were seized in September 2007.

In June 2019, customs inspectors in China detected ractopamine in a shipment of Canadian pork products destined for Chinese consumption. The Chinese government thereupon suspended not only pork, but also beef imports from Canada. Canadian Agriculture Minister Marie-Claude Bibeau stated that the CRFPCP certificate was a forgery and called in the RCMP, while Canadian Public Safety Minister Ralph Goodale stressed that the federal government would vigorously defend Canadian meat producers. It was also revealed that the Canadian Cattlemen's Association said in a statement that "We are fully confident in our meat production systems in Canada and the safeguards we have in place." Meanwhile, holes were found in the CRFPCP programme because the meat packer at the centre of the controversy was a chilled butcher shop only.<what> It was disclosed on 3 July that the Chinese authorities had discovered 188 falsified CRFPCP certificates.

=== Taiwan ===
Ractopamine has been banned in Taiwan since 2006. In the summer of 2007, two US shipments including ractopamine-laced pork were rejected by Taiwan's health authorities, while the Taiwan government had been considering lifting the ban on such imports. This resulted in mass protests in the capital city, Taipei, by swine farmers insisting that the ban remain in place. Health Minister Hou Sheng-mou (侯勝茂) declared no lifting of the ban would occur unless related laws were amended. Although the use of ractopamine in livestock is still banned and enforced on the domestic industry, and the government has maintained a "zero tolerance" policy on pork imports that contain it, Taiwan's legislature amended the food safety act in August 2012 to allow the import of beef products containing up to a maximum residue level of 10 parts per billion of the additive. The remaining restrictions have been an obstacle to the two nations signing a free-trade agreement, and the Office of the United States Trade Representative (USTR)'s 2018 Trade Policy Agenda and 2017 Annual Report assert that these remaining restrictions "...are not based upon science..." and highlights their removal as among the main priorities for the US in its trade with Taiwan. However, Taiwan plans to ease the import restrictions on US pork commencing January 1, 2021

=== Malaysia ===
According to the Malaysian Food Act 1983 and Regulations (as of 5 January 2010), ractopamine is allowed in pig muscle and fat (MRL of 10 ppb), pig liver (MRL of 40 ppb), and pig kidney (MRL of 90 ppb). Ractopamine is allowed as its half-life is lower, leading to reduced residues in the food, and the dose required to affect humans is much higher than other beta agonists. On 30 December 2008, the Malaysian Veterinary Services Department quarantined 10 of the 656 pig farms in Malaysia, as the livestock were found to contain the banned chemical.

=== Russia ===
The use of ractopamine in Russia is prohibited. On 6 June 2011, the Russian Ministry of Agriculture notified key meat import/exporters in Russia of a future prohibition of ractopamine in meat imported to Russia.

On 7 December 2012, the prohibition went into force, and pork and beef export to Russia required submission of compliance certificates confirming absence of ractopamine in exported meat.

== Pharmacokinetics in humans ==
A study was conducted to define the pharmacological response of humans to ractopamine. A single oral dose of 40 mg of ractopamine hydrochloride was given to human volunteers. The drug was rapidly absorbed; the mean blood plasma half-life was around 4 hrs and it was not detected in plasma 24 hrs after dosing. Less than 5% of total ractopamine excreted represented the parent drug, while the urinary metabolites were monoglucuronide and monosulfate conjugates, with ractopamine monosulfate being the major metabolite present.

The metabolic fate of ractopamine hydrochloride is similar in the target species (pigs and cattle), laboratory animals, and humans. Besides the pharmacology effect, ractopamine may cause intoxication effect; therefore, any consumption by humans of a meat and/or byproducts of animals that consumed ractopamine with feed for growth stimulation, may result in such clinical effects as tachycardia and other heart rate increases, tremor, headache, muscle spasm, or high arterial blood pressure.

== Safety concerns ==
=== Target animal safety ===
In swine, ractopamine is correlated with adverse effects, especially hyperactivity, trembling, and broken limbs, leading to censure by animal rights groups.

In a conversation with Boulder Weekly newspaper, Colorado State University Professor of Animal Science Temple Grandin, an expert on animal welfare, described harmful effects of ractopamine on feedlot animals, such as cattle with stiff, sore, and lame limbs, and increased heat stress. In the same column, she also opines that meat from ractopamine-treated animals may be tougher.

Ractopamine use is a factor in the incidence of downer pigs, animals that are unable to move or stand.

== Adverse effects ==
=== Acute toxicity ===
Oral LD_{50} levels in mice and rats are 3547–2545 mg/kg body weight (male and female) and 474–365 (male and female), respectively.

=== Genotoxicity and mutagenicity ===
Mutation studies in prokaryotes and eukaryotes show that ractopamine is not mutagenic. However, the results of several in vitro studies, including chromosome aberration tests in human lymphocytes, are positive. The positive genotoxic results are explained with limited evidence to be due to a secondary auto-oxidative mechanism from ractopamine-catechol-producing reactive intermediates.

=== Carcinogenicity ===
Ractopamine is not considered to be a carcinogen and not listed by IARC, NTP, ACGIH, or OSHA.

=== Cardiovascular effects ===
Dose-dependent changes of heart rate and cardiac output are observed within the first hour after administration of ractopamine and gradually return to baseline values. The systolic blood pressure will also increase in a dose-dependent manner, while the diastolic pressure remains unchanged.

=== Musculoskeletal effects ===
Skeletal muscle tremor is the most common adverse effect of beta-agonists, and is more likely to be seen after oral administration than after inhalation. Tremor results from an imbalance between fast- and slow-twitch muscle groups of the extremities, and its severity varies greatly between individuals.

=== Behavioral changes in humans ===
Restlessness, apprehension, and anxiety were reported effects after the use of various beta-agonists, particularly after oral or parenteral treatment. In pilot clinical trials with ractopamine, four patients showed little evidence for central nervous system stimulation. Whether long-term treatment with these drugs results in the development of tolerance to these adverse effects is unclear.

== Analytical method for residues in livestock ==
In cattle and swine tissue, it was found in 2007 that a procedure for the analysis of ractopamine residues in liver or muscle can be performed by high performance liquid chromatography (HPLC) with fluorescence detection. The confirmatory method include reversed-phase HPLC/electrospray ionization triple tandem quadrupole mass spectrometry. The limit of quantification of the drug using this LC/MS instrument was shown to be 1 ng/g (1 ppb). In cattle, a 2018 Chinese study promoted the use of hair as an indelible test of feed containing ractopamine.

== In popular culture ==
Stuntman and comedian Steve-O has publicly spoken of his involvement as a test subject in an early ractopamine study whose aim was to determine the stress limits of ractopamine saturation in humans. Glover says "Based on how dangerous the study was, the more money you get."
