= Environmental impact of pesticides =

Environmental effect

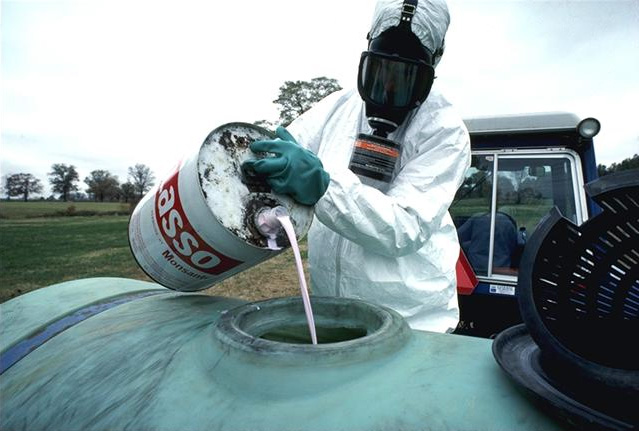
A farmworker wearing protective equipment pouring a concentrated pesticide into a sprayer tank with water

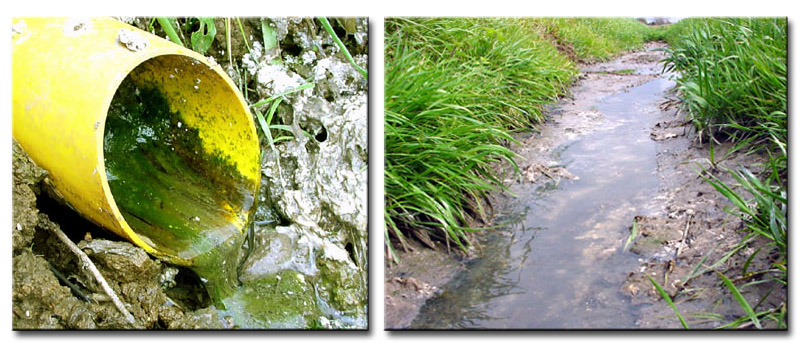
Drainage of fertilizers and pesticides into a stream

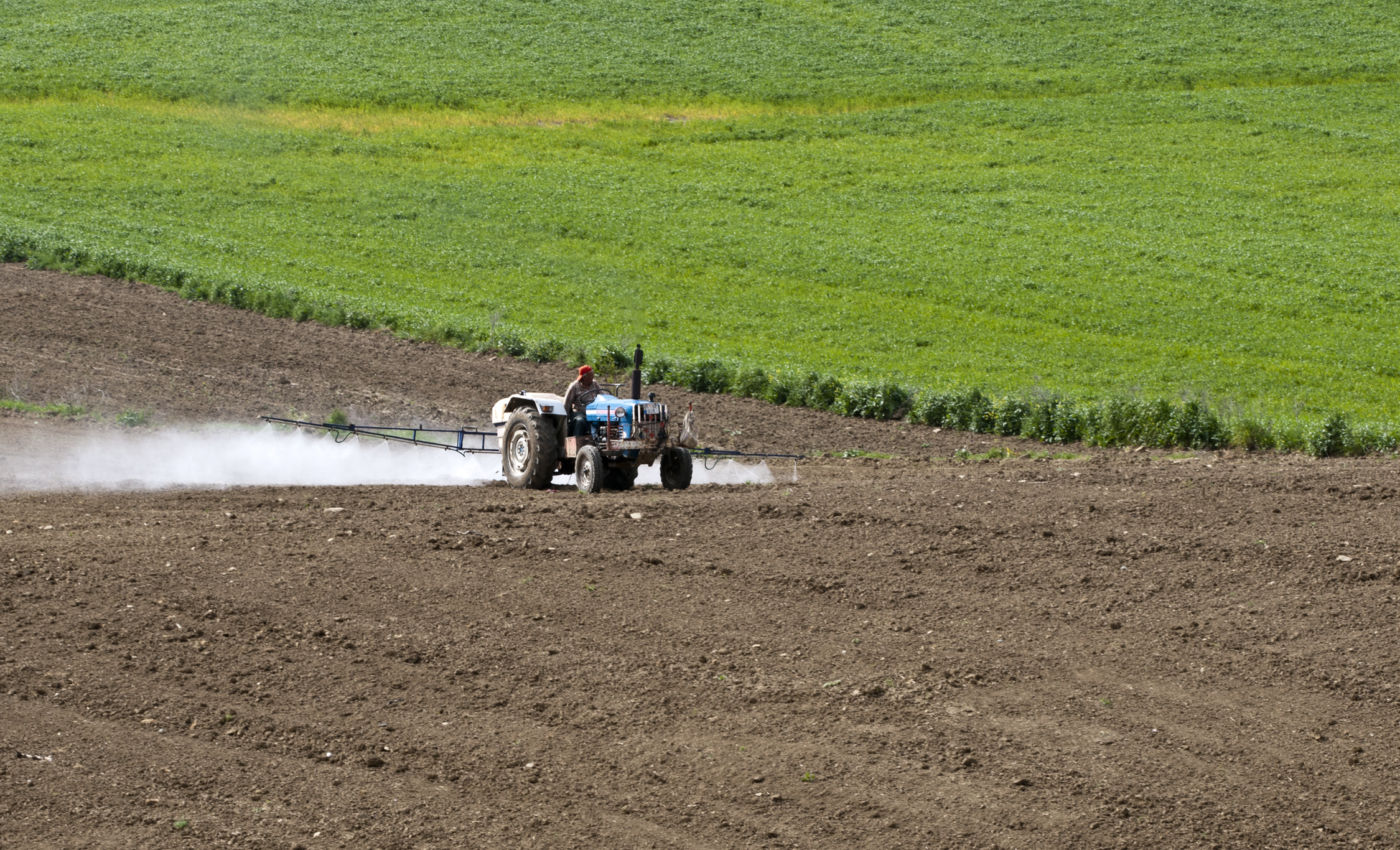
Pesticides being sprayed onto a recently plowed field by tractor. Aerial spraying is a main source of pesticide drift and application on loose topsoil increases the chance of runoff into waterways.

The environmental effects of pesticides describe the broad series of consequences of using pesticides. The unintended consequences of pesticides is one of the main drivers of the negative impact of modern industrial agriculture on the environment. Pesticides, because they are toxic chemicals meant to kill pest species, can affect non-target species, such as plants, animals and humans. Over 98% of sprayed insecticides and 95% of herbicides reach a destination other than their target species, because they are sprayed or spread across entire agricultural fields. Other agrochemicals, such as fertilizers, can also have negative effects on the environment.

The negative effects of pesticides are not just in the area of application. Runoff and pesticide drift can carry pesticides into distant aquatic environments or other fields, grazing areas, human settlements and undeveloped areas. Other problems emerge from poor production, transport, storage and disposal practices. Over time, repeat application of pesticides increases pest resistance, while its effects on other species can facilitate the pest's resurgence. Alternatives to heavy use of pesticides, such as integrated pest management, and sustainable agriculture techniques such as polyculture mitigate these consequences, without the harmful toxic chemical application.

Environmental modelling indicates that globally over 60% of global agricultural land (~24.5 million km²) is "at risk of pesticide pollution by more than one active ingredient", and that over 30% is at "high risk" of which a third are in high-biodiversity regions. Each pesticide or pesticide class comes with a specific set of environmental concerns. Such undesirable effects have led many pesticides to be banned, while regulations have limited and/or reduced the use of others. The global spread of pesticide use, including the use of older/obsolete pesticides that have been banned in some jurisdictions, has increased overall.

== History ==
Pesticide use by region over time

The first synthetic herbicides were discovered in the 1930's and 1940's. This was the era when synthetic antibiotics, plastics, and many other materials became available. Synthetic pesticides became popular rapidly after World War II. Crop yields increased significantly through the discovery of 2,4-D. Many insect infestations were addressed by DDT, greatly lowering rates of typhus and malaria worldwide. In 1962, an estimated 85,000,000 kilograms of DDT was produced in the US alone.

Public concern over the undesirable environmental effects of chemicals arose in the early 1960s with the publication of Rachel Carson′s book, Silent Spring. Shortly thereafter, DDT, originally used to combat malaria, and its metabolites were shown to cause population-level effects in raptorial birds. Initial studies in industrialized countries focused on acute mortality effects mostly involving birds or fish.

=== Modern pesticide usage ===
Today, over 3.5 billion kilograms of synthetic pesticides are used for the world's agriculture in an over $45 billion industry. Current lead agrichemical producers include Syngenta (ChemChina), Bayer Crop Science, BASF, Dow AgroSciences, FMC, ADAMA, Nufarm, Corteva, Sumitomo Chemical, UPL, and Huapont Life Sciences. Bayer CropScience and its acquisition of Monsanto led it to record profits in 2019 of over $10 billion in sales, which herbicide shares growing by 22%, followed closely by Syngenta.

In 2016, the United States consumed 322 million pounds (146,056,743 kg) of pesticides banned in the EU, 26 million pounds (11,793,402 kg) of pesticides banned in Brazil and 40 million pounds (18,143,695 kg) of pesticides banned in China, with most of banned pesticides banned staying constant or increasing in the United States over the past 25 years according to studies.

In the United States, conventional pesticide use peaked in 1979, and by 2007, had been reduced by 25 percent from the 1979 peak level, while US agricultural output increased by 43 percent over the same period.

== Specific pesticide effects ==
Pesticide environmental effects
| Pesticide/class | Effect(s) |
|---|---|
| Organochlorine DDT/DDE | Endocrine disruptor |
| | Thyroid disruption properties in rodents, birds, amphibians and fish |
| | Acute mortality attributed to inhibition of acetylcholinesterase activity |
| DDT | Egg shell thinning in raptorial birds |
| | Carcinogen |
| | Endocrine disruptor |
| DDT/Diclofol, Dieldrin and Toxaphene | Juvenile population decline and adult mortality in wildlife reptiles |
| DDT/Toxaphene/Parathion | Susceptibility to fungal infection |
| Triazine | Earthworms became infected with monocystid gregarines |
| Chlordane | Interact with vertebrate immune systems |
| Carbamates, the phenoxy herbicide 2,4-D, and atrazine | Interact with vertebrate immune systems |
| Anticholinesterase | Bird poisoning |
| | Animal infections, disease outbreaks and higher mortality. |
| Organophosphate | Thyroid disruption properties in rodents, birds, amphibians and fish |
| | Acute mortality attributed to inhibition of acetylcholine esterase activity |
| | Immunotoxicity, primarily caused by the inhibition of serine hydrolases or esterases |
| | Oxidative damage |
| | Modulation of signal transduction pathways |
| | Impaired metabolic functions such as thermoregulation, water and/or food intake and behavior, impaired development, reduced reproduction and hatching success in vertebrates. |
| Carbamate | Thyroid disruption properties in rodents, birds, amphibians and fish |
| | Impaired metabolic functions such as thermoregulation, water and/or food intake and behavior, impaired development, reduced reproduction and hatching success in vertebrates. |
| | Interact with vertebrate immune systems |
| | Acute mortality attributed to inhibition of acetylcholine esterase activity |
| Phenoxy herbicide 2,4-D | Interact with vertebrate immune systems |
| Atrazine | Interact with vertebrate immune systems |
| | Reduced northern leopard frog (Rana pipiens) populations because atrazine killed phytoplankton, thus allowing light to penetrate the water column and periphyton to assimilate nutrients released from the plankton. Periphyton growth provided more food to grazers, increasing snail populations, which provide intermediate hosts for trematode. |
| Pyrethroid | Thyroid disruption properties in rodents, birds, amphibians and fish |
| Thiocarbamate | Thyroid disruption properties in rodents, birds, amphibians and fish |
| Triazine | Thyroid disruption properties in rodents, birds, amphibians and fish |
| Triazole | Thyroid disruption properties in rodents, birds, amphibians and fish |
| | Impaired metabolic functions such as thermoregulation, water and/or food intake and behavior, impaired development, reduced reproduction and hatching success in vertebrates. |
| Neonicotinoic/Nicotinoid | respiratory, cardiovascular, neurological, and immunological toxicity in rats and humans |
| | Disrupt biogenic amine signaling and cause subsequent olfactory dysfunction, as well as affecting foraging behavior, learning and memory. |
| Imidacloprid, Imidacloprid/pyrethroid λ-cyhalothrin | Impaired foraging, brood development, and colony success in terms of growth rate and new queen production. |
| Thiamethoxam | High honey bee worker mortality due to homing failure (risks for colony collapse remain controversial). |
| Flupyradifurone | Lethal and sublethal adverse synergistic effects in bees. Its toxicity depends on season and nutritional stress, and can reduce bee survival, food consumption, thermoregulation, flight success, and increase flight velocity. It has the same mode of action of neonicotinoids. |
| Spinosyns | Affect various physiological and behavioral traits of beneficial arthropods, particularly hymenopterans. |
| Bt corn/Cry | Reduced abundance of some insect taxa, predominantly susceptible Lepidopteran herbivores as well as their predators and parasitoids. |
| Herbicide | Reduced food availability and adverse secondary effects on soil invertebrates and butterflies |
| | Decreased species abundance and diversity in small mammals. |
| Benomyl | Altered the patch-level floral display and later a two-thirds reduction of the total number of bee visits and in a shift in the visitors from large-bodied bees to small-bodied bees and flies. |
| Herbicide and planting cycles | Reduced survival and reproductive rates in seed-eating or carnivorous birds. |

=== Persistent organic pollutants ===
Persistent organic pollutants (POPs) are compounds that resist degradation and thus remain in the environment beyond their intended term. Some pesticides, including aldrin, chlordane, DDT, dieldrin, endrin, heptachlor, hexachlorobenzene, mirex, and toxaphene, are considered POPs. Some POPs have the ability to volatilize and travel great distances through the atmosphere to become deposited in remote regions. Such chemicals may have the ability to bioaccumulate and biomagnify and can biomagnify (i.e. become more concentrated) up to 70,000 times their original concentrations. POPs can affect non-target organisms in the environment and increase risk to humans by disruption in the endocrine, reproductive, and respiratory systems.

The half-life of pesticides is of great interest. Some pesticides degrade rapidly in the environment, others, called persistent, linger, causing undesired effects. and certain authors maintain that pesticide risk and impact assessment models rely on and are sensitive to information describing dissipation from plants.

The half-life for pesticides is explained in two NPIC fact sheets. Known degradation pathways are through: photolysis, chemical dissociation, sorption, bioaccumulation and plant or animal metabolism. A USDA fact sheet published in 1994 lists the soil adsorption coefficient and soil half-life for then-commonly used pesticides.

== Environmental effects ==
=== Air ===
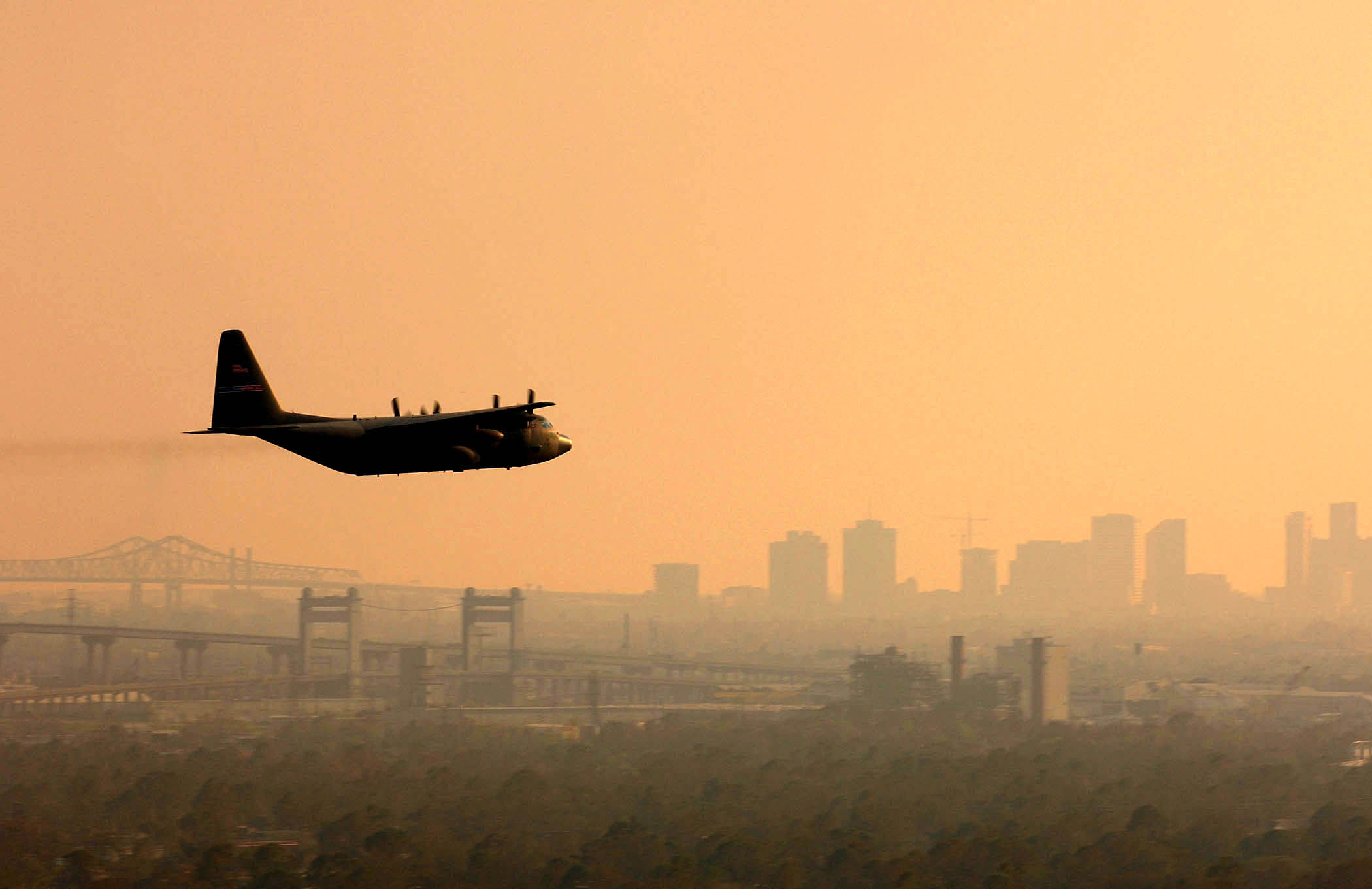
Aerial application of a mosquito pesticide over a city.

Pesticides contribute to air pollution. Pesticide drift occurs when pesticides suspended in the air as particles are carried by wind to other areas, potentially contaminating them. Pesticides that are applied to crops can volatilize and may be blown by winds into nearby areas, potentially posing a threat to wildlife. Weather conditions at the time of application as well as temperature and relative humidity change the spread of the pesticide in the air. As wind velocity increases so does the spray drift and exposure. Low relative humidity and high temperature result in more spray evaporating. The amount of inhalable pesticides in the outdoor environment is therefore often dependent on the season. Also, droplets of sprayed pesticides or particles from pesticides applied as dusts may travel on the wind to other areas, or pesticides may adhere to particles that blow in the wind, such as dust particles. Ground spraying produces less pesticide drift than aerial spraying does. Farmers can employ a buffer zone around their crop, consisting of empty land or non-crop plants such as Evergreen trees to serve as windbreaks and absorb the pesticides, preventing drift into other areas. Such windbreaks are legally required in the Netherlands.

Pesticides that are sprayed on to fields and used to fumigate soil can give off chemicals called volatile organic compounds, which can react with other chemicals and form a pollutant called ground level ozone. Pesticide use accounts for about 6 percent of total ground level ozone levels.

=== Water ===
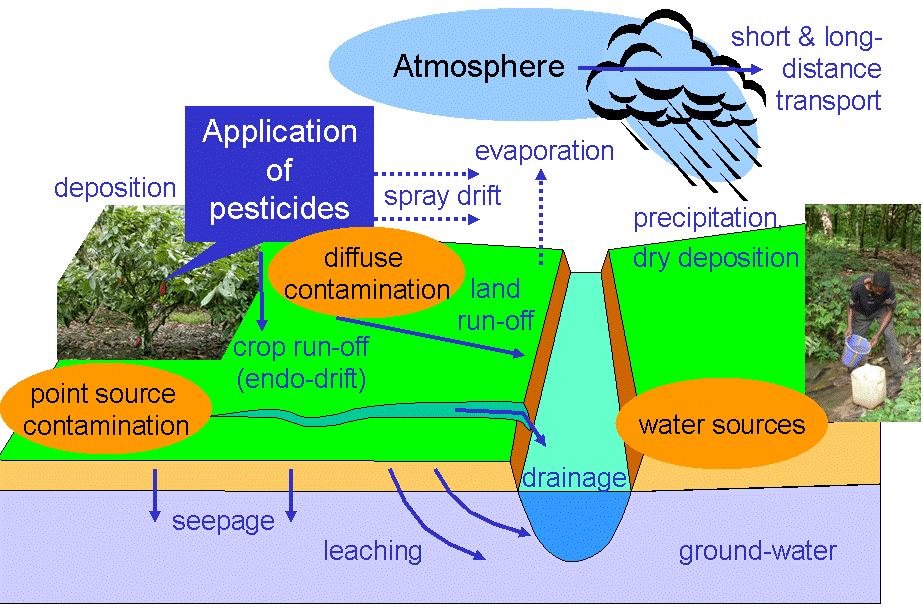
Pesticide pathways

In the United States, pesticides were found to pollute every stream and over 90% of wells sampled in a study by the US Geological Survey. Pesticide residues have also been found in rain and groundwater. Studies by the UK government showed that pesticide concentrations exceeded those allowable for drinking water in some samples of river water and groundwater.

Pesticide impacts on aquatic systems are often studied using a hydrology transport model to study movement and fate of chemicals in rivers and streams. As early as the 1970s quantitative analysis of pesticide runoff was conducted to predict amounts of pesticide that would reach surface waters.

There are four major routes through which pesticides reach the water: it may drift outside of the intended area when it is sprayed, it may percolate, or leach through the soil, it may be carried to the water as runoff, or it may be spilled, for example accidentally or through neglect. They may also be carried to water by eroding soil. Factors that affect a pesticide's ability to contaminate water include its water solubility, the distance from an application site to a body of water, weather, soil type, presence of a growing crop, and the method used to apply the chemical.

==== Water-focused regulations ====
In United States regulation, maximum limits of allowable concentrations for individual pesticides in drinking water are set by the Environmental Protection Agency (EPA) for public water systems. (There are no federal standards for private wells.) Ambient water quality standards for pesticide concentrations in water bodies are principally developed by state environmental agencies, with EPA oversight. These standards may be issued for individual water bodies, or may apply statewide.

The United Kingdom sets Environmental Quality Standards (EQS), or maximum allowable concentrations of some pesticides in bodies of water above which toxicity may occur.

The European Union regulates maximum concentrations of pesticides in water.

=== Soil ===
The extensive use of pesticides in agricultural production can degrade and damage the community of microorganisms living in the soil, particularly when these chemicals are overused or misused as chemical compounds build up in the soil. The full impact of pesticides on soil microorganisms is still not entirely understood; many studies have found deleterious effects of pesticides on soil microorganisms and biochemical processes, while others have found that the residue of some pesticides can be degraded and assimilated by microorganisms. The effect of pesticides on soil microorganisms is impacted by the persistence, concentration, and toxicity of the applied pesticide, in addition to various environmental factors. This complex interaction of factors makes it difficult to draw definitive conclusions about the interaction of pesticides with the soil ecosystem. In general, long-term pesticide application can disturb the biochemical processes of nutrient cycling.

Many of the chemicals used in pesticides are persistent soil contaminants, whose impact may endure for decades and adversely affect soil conservation.

The use of pesticides decreases the general biodiversity in the soil. Not using the chemicals results in higher soil quality, with the additional effect that more organic matter in the soil allows for higher water retention. This helps increase yields for farms in drought years, when organic farms have had yields 20-40% higher than their conventional counterparts. A smaller content of organic matter in the soil increases the amount of pesticide that will leave the area of application, because organic matter binds to and helps break down pesticides.

Degradation and sorption are both factors which influence the persistence of pesticides in soil. Depending on the chemical nature of the pesticide, such processes control directly the transportation from soil to water, and in turn to air and our food. Breaking down organic substances, degradation, involves interactions among microorganisms in the soil. Sorption affects bioaccumulation of pesticides which are dependent on organic matter in the soil. Weak organic acids have been shown to be weakly sorbed by soil, because of pH and mostly acidic structure. Sorbed chemicals have been shown to be less accessible to microorganisms. Aging mechanisms are poorly understood but as residence times in soil increase, pesticide residues become more resistant to degradation and extraction as they lose biological activity.

== Impacts ==
=== Plants ===
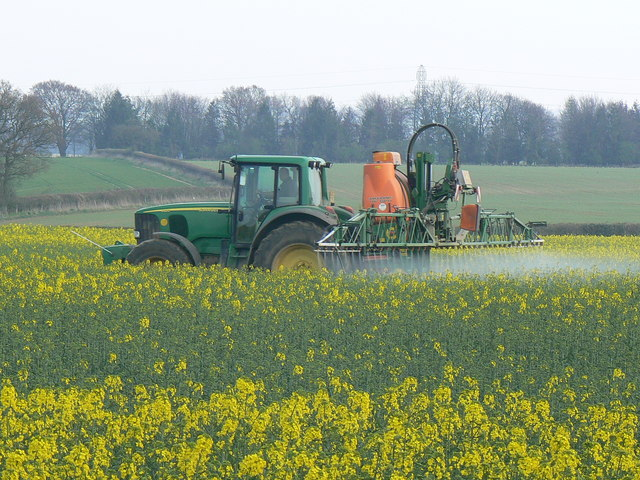
Crop spraying

Nitrogen fixation, which is required for the growth of vascular ("higher") plants, is hindered by pesticides in soil. The insecticides DDT, methyl parathion, and especially pentachlorophenol have been shown to interfere with legume-rhizobium chemical signaling. Reduction of this symbiotic chemical signaling results in reduced nitrogen fixation and thus reduced crop yields. Root nodule formation in these plants saves the world economy $10 billion in synthetic nitrogen fertilizer every year.

On the other side, pesticides have some direct harmful effect on plant including poor root hair development, shoot yellowing and reduced plant growth.

==== Pollinators ====
Pesticides can kill bees and are strongly implicated in pollinator decline, the loss of species that pollinate plants, including through the mechanism of Colony Collapse Disorder, in which worker bees from a beehive or western honey bee colony abruptly disappear. Application of pesticides to crops that are in bloom can kill honeybees, which act as pollinators. The USDA and USFWS estimate that US farmers lose at least $200 million a year from reduced crop pollination because pesticides applied to fields eliminate about a fifth of honeybee colonies in the US and harm an additional 15%.

=== Animals ===
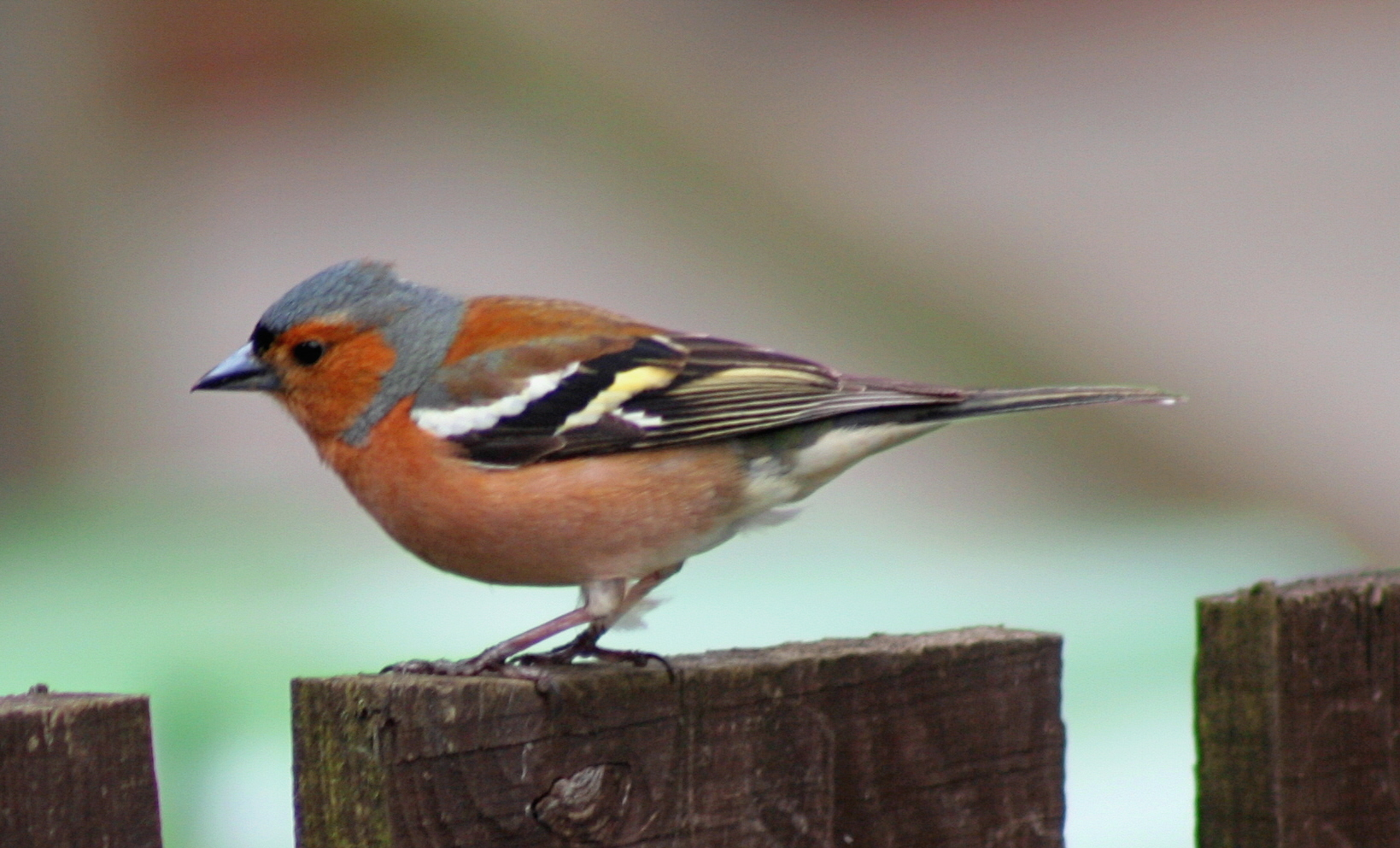
In England, the use of pesticides in gardens and farmland has seen a reduction in the number of common chaffinches.

Animal studies mostly focus on fish, insects, birds, amphibians and arachnids. Many kinds of animals are harmed by pesticides, leading many countries to regulate pesticide usage through Biodiversity Action Plans. Animals including humans may be poisoned by pesticide residues that remain on food, for example when wild animals enter sprayed fields or nearby areas shortly after spraying.

Pesticides can eliminate some animals' essential food sources, causing the animals to relocate, change their diet or starve. Residues can travel up the food chain; for example, birds can be harmed when they eat insects and worms that have consumed pesticides. Earthworms digest organic matter and increase nutrient content in the top layer of soil. They protect human health by ingesting decomposing litter and serving as bioindicators of soil activity. Pesticides have had harmful effects on growth and reproduction on earthworms. Some pesticides can bioaccumulate, or build up to toxic levels in the bodies of organisms that consume them over time, a phenomenon that impacts species high on the food chain especially hard.

==== Birds ====
Index of number of common farmland birds in the European Union and selected European countries, base equal to 100 in 1990: Sweden Netherlands France United Kingdom European Union Germany Switzerland

The US Fish and Wildlife Service estimates that 72 million birds are killed by pesticides in the United States each year. Bald eagles are common examples of nontarget organisms that are impacted by pesticide use. Rachel Carson's book Silent Spring uncovered the effects of bioaccumulation of the pesticide DDT in 1962.

Farmland birds are declining more rapidly than birds of any other biome in North America, a decline that is correlated with intensification and expansion of pesticide usage. In the farmland of the United Kingdom, populations of ten different bird species declined by 10 million breeding individuals between 1979 and 1999, allegedly from loss of plant and invertebrate species on which the birds feed. Throughout Europe, 116 species of birds were threatened as of 1999. Reductions in bird populations have been found to be associated with times and areas in which pesticides are used. DDE-induced egg shell thinning has especially affected European and North American bird populations. From 1990 to 2014 the number of common farmland birds has declined in the European Union as a whole and in France, Belgium and Sweden; in Germany, which relies more on organic farming and less on pesticides the decline has been slower; in Switzerland, which does not rely much on intensive agriculture, after a decline in the early 2000s the level has returned to the one of 1990.

In another example, some types of fungicides used in peanut farming are only slightly toxic to birds and mammals, but may kill earthworms, which can in turn reduce populations of the birds and mammals that feed on them.

Some pesticides come in granular form. Wildlife may eat the granules, mistaking them for grains of food. A few granules of a pesticide may be enough to kill a small bird. Herbicides may endanger bird populations by reducing their habitat. Furthermore, destruction of native habitat and conversion into other land-use types (e.g. agricultural, residential) contributes to the decline of these birds. Avicides poses a huge threat of direct poisoning of non-target birds. As poisoned birds can fly long distances before they die, death of non-target birds often remains unnoticed. Many countries have no registered pesticides of this group at all. In USA registered avicides belong to restricted use pesticides and can be used only by certified pest control operations.

==== Aquatic life ====
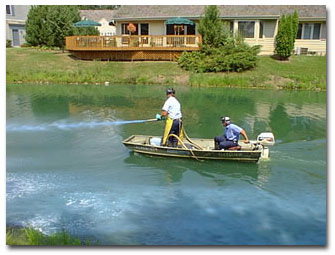
Using an aquatic herbicide

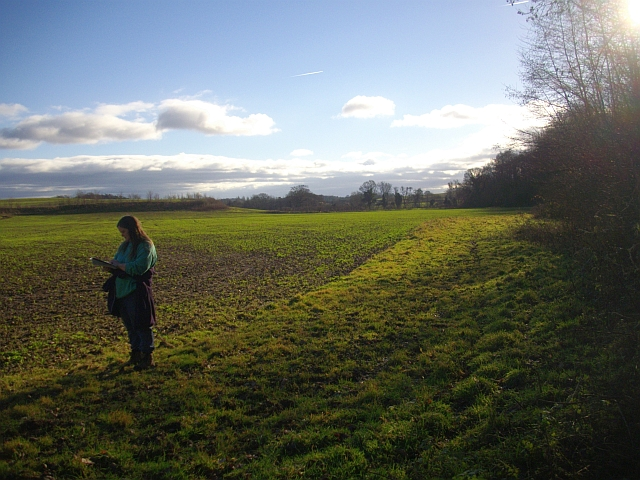
Wide field margins can reduce fertilizer and pesticide pollution in streams and rivers.

Fish and other aquatic biota may be harmed by pesticide-contaminated water. Pesticide surface runoff into rivers and streams can be highly lethal to aquatic life, sometimes killing all the fish in a particular stream.

Application of herbicides to bodies of water can cause fish kills when the dead plants decay and consume the water's oxygen, suffocating the fish. Herbicides such as copper sulfate that are applied to water to kill plants are toxic to fish and other water animals at concentrations similar to those used to kill the plants. Repeated exposure to sublethal doses of some pesticides can cause physiological and behavioral changes that reduce fish populations, such as abandonment of nests and broods, decreased immunity to disease and decreased predator avoidance.

Application of herbicides to bodies of water can kill plants on which fish depend for their habitat.

Pesticides can accumulate in bodies of water to levels that kill off zooplankton, the main source of food for young fish. Pesticides can also kill off insects on which some fish feed, causing the fish to travel farther in search of food and exposing them to greater risk from predators.

The faster a given pesticide breaks down in the environment, the less threat it poses to aquatic life. Insecticides are typically more toxic to aquatic life than herbicides and fungicides.

==== Amphibians ====
In the past several decades, amphibian populations have declined across the world, for unexplained reasons which are thought to be varied but of which pesticides may be a part.

Pesticide mixtures appear to have a cumulative toxic effect on frogs. Tadpoles from ponds containing multiple pesticides take longer to metamorphose and are smaller when they do, decreasing their ability to catch prey and avoid predators. Exposing tadpoles to the organochloride endosulfan at levels likely to be found in habitats near fields sprayed with the chemical kills the tadpoles and causes behavioral and growth abnormalities.

The herbicide atrazine can turn male frogs into hermaphrodites, decreasing their ability to reproduce. Both reproductive and nonreproductive effects in aquatic reptiles and amphibians have been reported. Crocodiles, many turtle species and some lizards lack sex-distinct chromosomes until after fertilization during organogenesis, depending on temperature. Embryonic exposure in turtles to various PCBs causes a sex reversal. Across the United States and Canada disorders such as decreased hatching success, feminization, skin lesions, and other developmental abnormalities have been reported.

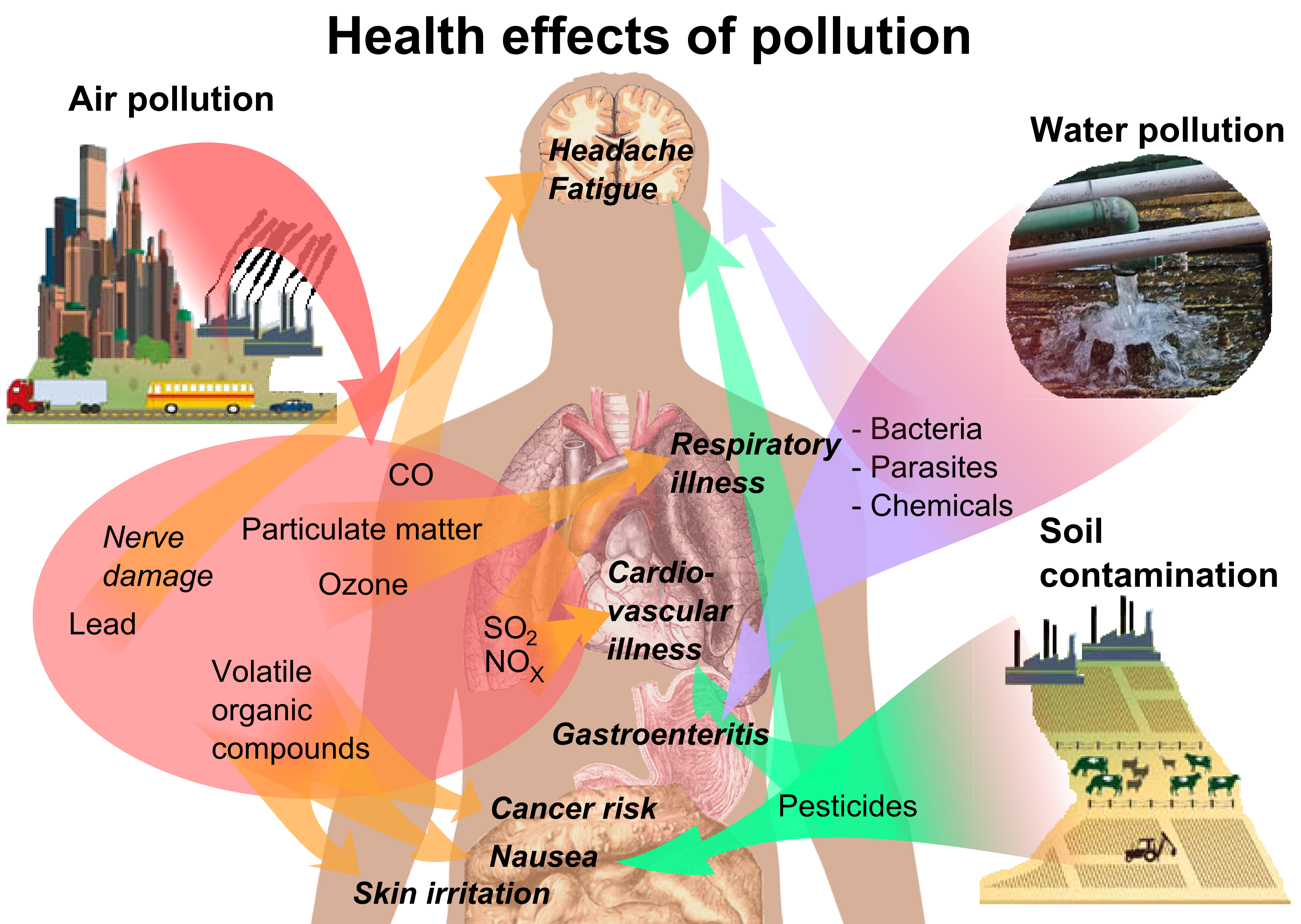
Pesticides are implicated in a range of impacts on human health due to pollution.

=== Humans ===
Pesticides can enter the body through inhalation of aerosols, dust and vapor that contain pesticides; through oral exposure by consuming food/water; and through skin exposure by direct contact. Pesticides secrete into soils and groundwater which can end up in drinking water, and pesticide spray can drift and pollute the air.

The effects of pesticides on human health depend on the toxicity of the chemical and the length and magnitude of exposure. Farm workers and their families experience the greatest exposure to agricultural pesticides through direct contact. Every human contains pesticides in their fat cells.

Children are more susceptible and sensitive to pesticides, because they are still developing and have a weaker immune system than adults. Children may be more exposed due to their closer proximity to the ground and tendency to put unfamiliar objects in their mouth. Hand to mouth contact depends on the child's age, much like lead exposure. Children under the age of six months are more apt to experience exposure from breast milk and inhalation of small particles. Pesticides tracked into the home from family members increase the risk of exposure. Toxic residue in food may contribute to a child's exposure. Epidemiological studies have reported adverse effects of certain pesticides at current levels of exposure on children's cognitive development. The chemicals can bioaccumulate in the body over time.

Exposure effects can range from mild skin irritation to birth defects, tumors, genetic changes, blood and nerve disorders, endocrine disruption, coma or death. Developmental effects have been associated with pesticides. Recent increases in childhood cancers in throughout North America, such as leukemia, may be a result of somatic cell mutations. Insecticides targeted to disrupt insects can have harmful effects on mammalian nervous systems. Both chronic and acute alterations have been observed in exposes. DDT and its breakdown product DDE disturb estrogenic activity and possibly lead to breast cancer. Fetal DDT exposure reduces male penis size in animals and can produce undescended testicles. Pesticide can affect fetuses in early stages of development, in utero and even if a parent was exposed before conception. Reproductive disruption has the potential to occur by chemical reactivity and through structural changes.

=== Pest resistance ===
Pesticide application can artificially select for resistant pests. In this diagram, the first generation happens to have an insect with a heightened resistance to a pesticide (red) After pesticide application, its descendants represent a larger proportion of the population, because sensitive pests (white) have been selectively killed. After repeated applications, resistant pests may comprise the majority of the population.

Pesticide resistance describes the decreased susceptibility of a pest population to a pesticide that was previously effective at controlling the pest. Pest species evolve pesticide resistance via natural selection: the most resistant specimens survive and pass on their acquired heritable changes traits to their offspring. If a pest has resistance then that will reduce the pesticide's efficacy – efficacy and resistance are inversely related.

Cases of resistance have been reported in all classes of pests (i.e. crop diseases, weeds, rodents, etc.), with 'crises' in insect control occurring early-on after the introduction of pesticide use in the 20th century. The Insecticide Resistance Action Committee (IRAC) definition of insecticide resistance is 'a heritable change in the sensitivity of a pest population that is reflected in the repeated failure of a product to achieve the expected level of control when used according to the label recommendation for that pest species'.

Pesticide resistance is increasing. Farmers in the US lost 7% of their crops to pests in the 1940s; over the 1980s and 1990s, the loss was 13%, even though more pesticides were being used. Over 500 species of pests have evolved a resistance to a pesticide. Other sources estimate the number to be around 1,000 species since 1945.

Although the evolution of pesticide resistance is usually discussed as a result of pesticide use, it is important to keep in mind that pest populations can also adapt to non-chemical methods of control. For example, the northern corn rootworm (Diabrotica barberi) became adapted to a corn-soybean crop rotation by spending the year when the field is planted with soybeans in a diapause.

As of 2014, few new weed killers are near commercialization, and none with a novel, resistance-free mode of action. Similarly, as of January 2019 discovery of new insecticides is more expensive and difficult than ever.

=== Pest rebound and secondary pest outbreaks ===
Non-target organisms can also be impacted by pesticides. In some cases, a pest insect that is controlled by a beneficial predator or parasite can flourish should an insecticide application kill both pest and beneficial populations. A study comparing biological pest control and pyrethroid insecticide for diamondback moths, a major cabbage family insect pest, showed that the pest population rebounded due to loss of insect predators, whereas the biocontrol did not show the same effect. Likewise, pesticides sprayed to control mosquitoes may temporarily depress mosquito populations, they may result in a larger population in the long run by damaging natural controls. This phenomenon, wherein the population of a pest species rebounds to equal or greater numbers than it had before pesticide use, is called pest resurgence and can be linked to elimination of its predators and other natural enemies.

Loss of predator species can also lead to a related phenomenon called secondary pest outbreaks, an increase in problems from species that were not originally a problem due to loss of their predators or parasites. An estimated third of the 300 most damaging insects in the US were originally secondary pests and only became a major problem after the use of pesticides. In both pest resurgence and secondary outbreaks, their natural enemies were more susceptible to the pesticides than the pests themselves, in some cases causing the pest population to be higher than it was before the use of pesticide.

== Alternatives ==
While various measures for minimizing pesticide use apply to gardens, they are not relevant to agriculture on scale.

Biological controls such as resistant plant varieties and the use of pheromones, have been successful and at times permanently resolve a pest problem. Integrated Pest Management (IPM) employs chemical use only when other alternatives are ineffective. IPM causes less harm to humans and the environment. The focus is broader than on a specific pest, considering a range of pest control alternatives. Biotechnology can also be an innovative way to control pests. Strains can be genetically modified (GM) to increase their resistance to pests.

Prior or during the development of synthetic pesticides, many natural ones were identified including pyrethrum, rotenone, nicotine, sabadilla, and quassin. Synthetic compounds proved cheaper and far more effective than natural pesticides.

Biopesticides such as canola oil and baking soda that contain curtain active ingredients from natural substances are an environmentally friendly alternative for toxic pesticides. There are three categories of biopesticides; microbial pesticides, plant-incorporated protectants (PIPs), and biochemical biopesticides. The alternatives to pesticides include a range of genetic material introduction to plants that target a particular pest, and active ingredients that control the mating and reproduction of certain pests or kill target pests. Biopesticides are affective in small quantities and degrade quickly making them an eco-friendly alternative to pesticides. They are often used in Integrated Pest Management (IPM) as well and has been an important component to the UK IPM strategy for its crop protection.

== Waste and disposal ==
In the United States, the Environmental Protection Agency (EPA) suggests proper use of pesticides and disposal that follows federal or individual state guidance for farmers or commercial users. Commercial users of pesticides are told to follow the disposal instructions on the labels of the pesticides while using necessary safety measures for the disposal of hazardous waste. They are also advised to call for assistance by their local agencies in the disposal of unwanted or unused pesticides.

Still are there environmental problems that emerge from runoff and other negative effects of pesticides. Runoff of pesticides into wastewater and pesticide drift into other ecosystems has led to research in the removal and remediation of pesticides in the environment. Research has been done on different methods to treat pesticide pollution including the use of activated carbon absorption and advanced oxidation processes. Different methods of pesticide removal require different costs and can carry different removal outcomes. Some methods require low cost techniques but many result in byproducts that require an extra cost for removal or unwarranted environmental impacts.

There is an ongoing research focused on pesticide removal, a 2022 study for example demonstrated excellent removal efficiency of 80% for often used pesticide chlorpyrifos through usage magnetic plant biobots.

=== Activated carbon absorption ===
Due to the properties of activated carbon, different types have been researched as potential treatment for absorbing different pesticide species. Researchers found a use for activated carbon from tangerine seeds in the absorption of pesticides. Researches are utilizing this tangerine seed activated carbon in the removal process of carbamate pesticides that have been linked to an increased risk of cancer and other health risks. Absorption by activated carbon has been found to be a successful and cost-efficient way of removing pesticides.

=== Advanced oxidation process (AOP) ===
Advanced oxidation processes have been used to combat against the problem of pesticide residue on fruits and vegetables. AOP and its technologies have been used in the removal efforts of pesticide pollutants in wastewater using different chemical reactions to target different pollutants. Researchers have found this method of pesticide removal using coupled free chlorine/ultrasound to be successful at removing pesticide residue from vegetables.

== Activism ==
=== Pesticide Action Network ===
While dubbed economic and ecologically sound practices by suppliers, the effects of agricultural pesticides can include toxicity, bioaccumulation, persistence, and physiological responses in humans and wildlife, and several international NGOs, such as Pesticide Action Network, have risen in response to the economic activities of these larger transnational corporations. Historically, PAN's contributions targeting the Dirty Dozen have resulted in treaties and global environmental law banning persistent organic pollutants (POPs), such as endosulfan, and their campaign work on Prior Informed Consent (PIC) for countries in the Global South to know what hazardous and banned chemicals they might be importing have contributed to the culmination of the Rotterdam Convention on Prior Informed Consent, which went into effect in 2004. PAN's work, according to their website, involves "shifting global aid away from pesticides", in addition to community monitoring and serving as a watchdog for the World Bank policy failures. Additionally, Pesticide Action Network members helped co-author the International Assessment of Agricultural Knowledge, Science and Technology for Development (IAASTD), working to center agroecological knowledge and farming techniques as crucial to the future of agriculture.

== See also ==
- Pesticides in the United States
- Health effects of pesticides
