= Regulation of pesticides in the European Union =

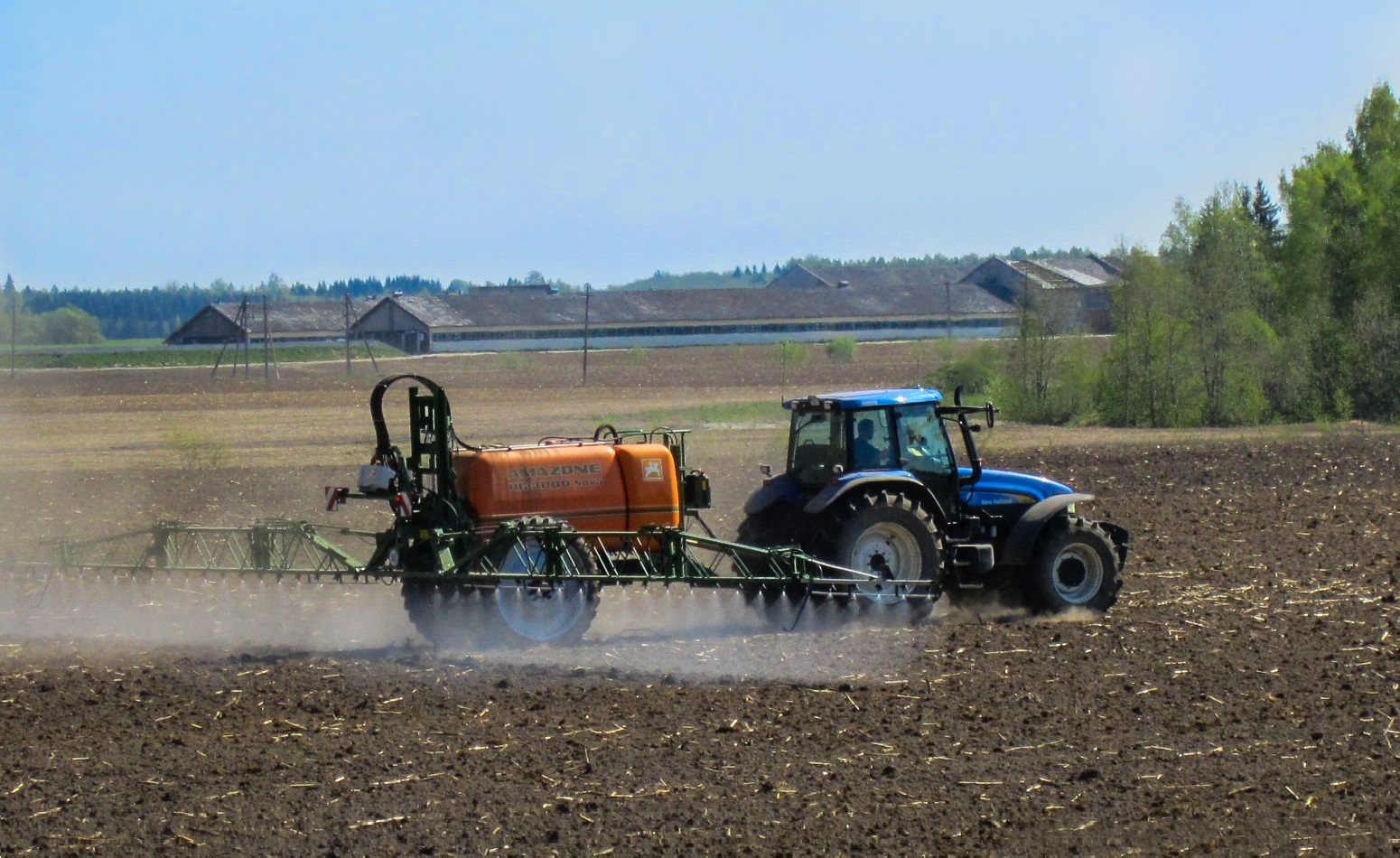
Pesticide spraying in spring

A pesticide, also called Plant Protection Product (PPP), which is a term used in regulatory documents, consists of several different components. The active ingredient in a pesticide is called “active substance” and these active substances either consist of chemicals or micro-organisms. The aims of these active substances are to specifically take action against organisms that are harmful to plants (Art. 2(2), Regulation (EC) No 1107/2009). In other words, active substances are the active components against pests and plant diseases.

In the Regulation (EC) No 1107/2009, a pesticide is defined based on how it is used. Thus, pesticides have to fulfill certain criteria in order to be called pesticides. Among others, the criteria include that they either protect plants against harmful organisms - by killing or in other ways preventing the organism from performing harm, that they enhance the natural ability of plants to defend themselves against these harmful organisms, or that they kill off competing plants such as weeds.

Within the European Union (EU) a 2-tiered approach is used for the approval and authorisation of pesticides. Firstly, before an actual pesticide can be developed and put on the European market, the active substance of the pesticide needs to be approved for the European Union. Only after approval of an active substance, a procedure of approval of the Plant Protection Product (PPP) can begin in the individual Member States. In case of approval, there is a monitoring programme to make sure the pesticide residues in food are below the limits set by the European Food Safety Authority (EFSA).

The use of PPPs (i.e. pesticides) in the European Union is regulated by the Regulation No 1107/2009 on Plant Protection Products in cooperation with other EU Regulations and Directives (e.g. the regulation on maximum residue levels in food (MRL); Regulation (EC) No 396/2005, and the Directive on sustainable use of pesticides; Directive 2009/128/EC).

These regulatory documents are set to ensure safe use of pesticides in the EU regarding human health and environmental sustainability. The responsible authorities within the EU working with pesticide regulation are the European Commission, European Food Safety Authority (EFSA), European Chemical Agency (ECHA); working in cooperation with the EU Member States. Additionally, important stakeholders are the chemical producing companies, which develop PPPs and active substances that are to be evaluated by the regulatory authorities mentioned above.

Conservative Agriculture Spokesman Anthea McIntyre MEP and colleague Daniel Dalton MEP were appointed to the European Parliament's special committee on pesticides on 16 March 2018. Sitting for nine months, the committee will examine the scientific evaluation of glyphosate, the world's most commonly used weed killer which was relicensed for five years by the EU in December after months of uncertainty. They will also consider wider issues around the authorisation of pesticides.

== Procedure of active substance approval ==
In the EU, there is a detailed procedure (Regulation (EC) No 1107/2009) to evaluate whether an active substance is regarded as safe for human health and the environment. The procedure of approving new substances follows the steps listed below.

=== Submission of the application and dossier ===
The first step requires that an applicant (a company or association of producers) should submit a dossier to a Member State (called the Rapporteur Member State) in order to ask for the permission before putting an active substance on the market. The application must contain supporting scientific data and studies (i.e. toxicological and ecotoxicological relevance of metabolites, acceptable operator exposure level (AOEL), acceptable daily intake (ADI), genotoxicity testing etc. (Art. 4 and Annex II of Regulation (EC) No 1107/2009.) and Regulation (EC) No 283/2013)

=== Evaluation by the rapporteur member state ===
The Rapporteur Member State evaluates the application and shall within 45 days communicate (Art. 9(1) Regulation (EC) No 1107/2009) to the applicant that submitted the dossier. Furthermore, they will check whether the dossier is complete. If elements are missing, the applicant has 3 months to complete the dossier, otherwise the application is not considered admissible.

If the dossier is considered admissible, the Rapporteur Member State will notify the applicant and the competent authorities (other Member States, EFSA and the European Commission) and start evaluating the active substance. The applicant will then send the dossier to the three mentioned authorities. Moreover, EFSA will create a summary of the dossier and make it available for the public.

== Draft Assessment Report from Rapporteur Member State ==
Within 12 months after the notification of admissibility, the Rapporteur Member State produces a Draft Assessment Report. This report aims to check if the active substance satisfies the criteria for approval listed in the Regulation. This report is submitted to the European Commission and EFSA. If additional information is needed, the Rapporteur Member State will set a period of maximum 6 months for the submission of the revised application. In addition, the European Commission and EFSA shall be informed (Art. 11 Regulation (EC) No 1107/2009).

=== Peer review by European Food Safety Authority and conclusion ===
European Food Safety Authority’s Pesticides Unit is responsible for the peer reviewing of the risk assessments on active substances. The EFSA is required to provide a conclusion on whether the active substance satisfies the criteria for approval.

When the Draft Assessment Report from the Rapporteur Member State has been received by EFSA, the report will be shared among other Member States and the applicant within 30 days after it has been received, and it shall be made available for the public (Art. 12 Regulation (EC) No 1107/2009).

The applicant, the Member State and the public have 60 days to provide comments. After that, EFSA has 120 days to submit a conclusion and forward it to the applicant, the Member States, and the European Commission. The EFSA will also make the conclusion available to the public (Art. 12 Regulation (EC) No 1107/2009).

After the conclusion of EFSA, the European Commission presents a review report to the Standing Committee for Food Chain and Animal Health. This standing committee votes on approval or non-approval of the active substance.

== Publication ==
Based on the review report, a Regulation will be adopted according to the final decision (i.e. whether the substance is approved, not approved, or the application should be modified).

All approved active substances are included in the Official Journal of the European Union, which contains the list of active substances that have been already approved (Annex I of Directive 98/8/EC). The European Commission has subsequently the task of managing and updating the list of approved active substances, which is available online for the public.

=== Renewing the approval of active substances ===
Active substances may be approved for a maximum of up to 15 years. This approval period is proportional to the risks posed by the use of these substances.

However, when an active substance is considered necessary by the European Commission, it could be approved for a maximum 5 years, even if not all approval criteria of the Regulation (EC) No 1107/2009 are met.

At the renewal time, new knowledge regarding the active substance will be taken into consideration.

== Procedure of Plant Protection Product approval ==
The procedure of applying for an authorisation of a PPP begins with the applicant who wishes to produce a PPP. Authorisation for the product must be sought from every Member State that the applicant wants to sell the product to.

The procedure and requirements for authorising a PPP are explained below.

=== Requirements and content ===
The authorisation of a PPP, its use and placing on the market is done by the Member States. For that, a PPP has to meet specific requirements:

- Scientific and technical knowledge of its active substances, synergists, safeners, co-formulants.
- Scientific knowledge regarding toxicological, ecotoxicological and environmental aspects. For instance, the ecotoxicological data required consist of, among others, acute toxicity to fish, aquatic invertebrates or effects on aquatic algae and macrophytes. It also includes studies on earthworms and other terrestrial species (Art. 29(1) and (2) of Regulation (EC) No 1107/2009 and Regulation (EC) No 284/2013).
- Technical knowledge, including production, use, storage and residue handling.

Moreover, in the authorisation it is necessary to define elements in which the PPP may be used. This includes, among others, non-agricultural areas, plant products or plants, and their purpose. Other information that can be included, cover the maximum dosage per hectare in each individual application, the period of time between the most recent application and harvest, and the maximum application numbers each year.

The authorisation of a PPP shall not exceed one year, counting from the expire date of the approval for the active substances, synergists and safeners contained in the PPP. Re-evaluation of similar PPP for comparative assessment containing candidates for substitution may be granted.

== The authorisation procedure of a Plant Protection Product (Pesticides) ==
The application for authorisation itself contains many parts and it should first and foremost clearly state where and how the PPP should be applied. Secondly, the applicants themselves should specify which Member State they wish, would carry out the evaluation of the PPP. If the PPP previously has been evaluated in another Member State, a copy of the conclusions from that evaluation should be attached. Moreover, the application should be accompanied by several dossiers containing, among other things, ecotoxicological data (see section “Requirements and content” above). One dossier for the PPP itself, and one for each active ingredient in the PPP is required. The applicant should also provide a draft of the product label clearly showing the hazard labels necessary for the specific product. There are several other things an application should include. This is more thoroughly described in Art. 33-35 of Regulation (EC) No 1107/2009.

The Member State assessing the PPP needs to perform an objective evaluation and allow other Member States to express their opinions. The evaluation results in an authorisation or a rejection of the PPP. This assessment takes many things into consideration. Among others, the Member State specifically looks at all the ingredients in the PPP and assesses whether they are approved for this type of use or not. They further look at if the risks associated with the PPP are limited without compromising the function of the product. If a PPP is given authorisation, it often has certain restrictions regarding the distribution and use, like mentioned in the “Requirements and content” above, in order to protect human health and the environment. If the PPP is shown to pose an unacceptable risk to humans or nature, it is not authorised. No matter what the Member State decides on, they have to justify the outcome of the evaluation in a document and provide it to both the applicant seeking authorisation, and the European Commission (Art. 36-38 of Regulation (EC) No 1107/2009).

=== Mutual recognition ===
A company or organization in possession of a valid authorisation for a PPP can apply for mutual recognition and obtain the approval for such products with the same use(s) under similar agricultural conditions.

Requirements, contents and procedures for the recognition are stated in Articles 40-42 of Regulation (EU) 1107/2009.

Mutual Recognition can only be applied if there is an existing authorisation for the PPP in another Member State. Applications can be made through the Plant Protection Products Application Management System for products that have been authorised via the system.

Some parts of the application procedure are managed and handled outside of the Plant Protection Products Application Management System by manual or electronic processes in the Member States.

The Plant Protection Products Application Management System is an online tool, thought to enable industry users to create applications for PPPs and submit these to Member States for evaluation and authorisation. The objectives of the system are: help harmonising the formal requirements for application among Member States, facilitate mutual recognition of authorisations between Member States in order to speed up time to market, improve the management of the evaluation of the authorisation process as wells as providing correct information to stakeholders on time.

== Renewal, withdrawal and amendment ==
After an active substance has been re-approved for use, all PPPs containing this active substance also have to be re-approved within three months. If the applicants do not hand in a re-application, their authorisation for the product will expire in accordance to Art. 32. If expired, the PPP is allowed to stay on the market for sale up to six months, and allowed to be stored and disposed up to a year. To re-apply for authorisation the applicant has to provide a Renewal Assessment Report which shall contain any newly submitted data supporting the re-approval, as well as the original data if still relevant. The Member States also conduct this evaluation, but in the future this will be done through the Plant Protection Products Application Management Systems. Any holder of authorisation can choose to withdraw or amend its application at any time, though the reason why should be stated. If there are acute concerns for human, animal and/or environmental health the PPPs should be immediately withdrawn from the market. A withdrawal can also be made on the base of false and misleading informations, and/or on improvements in scientific and technological knowledge. All information about renewal, amendment and withdrawal can be found in Art. 43 - 46 of Regulation 1107/2009.

== Special cases ==
When all active substances in a product are considered as low-risk active substances, a PPP will be approved as a low-risk PPP, except risk mitigation measures are required. The applicant of a PPP must demonstrate that all criteria for a low-risk PPP are met (Art. 47 of Regulation (EC) No 1107/2009). Among others, the criteria for consideration of low-risk active substances include not being classified as mutagenic, carcinogenic, toxic to reproduction, very toxic or toxic. Furthermore, they must not be persistent, deemed as endocrine disruptor or have neurotoxic or immunotoxic properties (Art. 47 and Annex II of Regulation (EC) No 1107/2009).

Applicants are encouraged to make use of this special case through a prolonged approval duration of 15 years and the possibility of a fast-track authorisation in 120 days instead of one year to facilitate the placement on the market of such PPPs.

Plant Protection Products comprising a genetically modified organism will also be examined in accordance to Directive 2001/18/EC on the deliberate release of genetically modified organisms into the environment. An authorisation will only be granted, when a written consent referring to this Directive is approved (Art. 48 of Regulation (EC) No 1107/2009).

The use and placing on the market of PPP-treated seeds is regulated through Art. 49 of Regulation (EC) No 1107/2009 and will not be prohibited, when authorisation is granted by at least one other Member State. But, when there is substantial concern that PPPs from treated seeds pose a serious risk to animals, humans or the environment, and no adequate mitigation measures are available, measures will be taken immediately, that is restricting or prohibiting the use of the respective PPP.

For PPPs containing candidates for substitution, a comparative assessment will be conducted. An authorisation will not be granted where the assessment of risks and benefits concludes that – among others – a substitution of the PPP is significantly safer for the environment, humans and animals, and not economically or practically disadvantageous (Art. 50 of Regulation (EC) No 1107/2009).

An applicant may ask for an extension to minor uses of PPPs (Art. 51 of Regulation (EC) No 1107/2009). This procedure is a facilitated way for the authorisation of a PPP. Lists on what minor uses in a specific Member State are provided by the European Minor Uses Database (EUMUDA).

A PPP already approved in one Member State will be permitted for parallel trade, thus the introduction, placement on the market, and uses in another Member State. Following Art. 52 of Regulation (EC) No 1107/2009, the application will be authorised - provided the applicant demonstrates that the PPP meets the requirements to be identical to the already authorised one.

== Derogation ==
By partial suppression of Article 28, which states that a PPP will not be marketed or used in a Member State without authorisation, derogation states that such a PPP can be used under limited and controlled conditions where it appears necessary. A Member State authorising such a product will inform other Member States with detailed information that led to such a decision. It may be for purposes of research and development (Art. 53, 54 Regulation (EC) No 1107/2009).

=== Use and information ===
To ensure that PPPs are handled properly, a considerable amount of information is to be provided by the holder of an authorisation for such a product (Art. 56 Regulation (EC) No 1107/2009). New information on potential harmful effects on human or animal health concerning the PPP itself, its active substances, any associated metabolites, safeners or co-formulants have to be reported immediately to the Member State(s) that granted its authorisation. In such a case, it is up to the first Member State in a zone that granted the product's authorisation to evaluate and assess this information and come to a decision whether the product should be withdrawn or its conditions for use should be amended. The same Member State is also responsible for communicating this information to other Member States that might be concerned.

Information on PPPs authorised for use or that have been withdrawn shall also be available to the public in electronic form and updated every three months. This information shall at the very least include the business name of the holder of the product's authorisation, the trade name of the product, its type of preparation, its composition, its authorised uses (including minor uses) and its safety classifications. As well as this, information on withdrawal of a product's authorisation should be provided to the public if it is related to safety concerns.

== Monitoring of Plant Protection Products ==
=== Monitoring of pesticide residues in food products ===
In order to protect human health and the environment, monitoring of PPP residues in food is a crucial step. With this process the EU can check the prediction of the safe use of respective PPPs.

In September 2008, the European Union issued new and revised Maximum Residue Limits (MRLs) in plants for the roughly 1,100 pesticides ever used in the world. The revision was intended to simplify the previous system, under which certain pesticide residues were regulated by the Commission, others were regulated by Member States, and others were not regulated at all.

=== How Maximum Residue Levels are monitored ===
The monitoring of the determined Maximum Residue Levels (MRLs) of pesticides in food is the duty of the responsible authorities of the Member States. In addition to the national monitoring programmes, all reporting countries are requested to monitor and analyse food products and processed cereal-based baby food according to the Regulation ((EU) No 400/2014) for the European monitoring programme.

Annually, the EFSA is modelling and assessing the risk of residues of pesticides in food. In this process, short-term (acute) exposure and long-term (chronic) exposure scenarios are analysed.

A risk assessment based on a short-term exposure includes mainly the comparison of the estimated uptake and/or exposure of pesticide residues via food in a short time period (one meal or within 24-hours). The chronic risk assessment is the estimated uptake and/or exposure levels of pesticide residues via food for a long-term period (predicted lifetime of a human). The evaluated data from the calculation models are compared to the experimental data (ecotoxicological reference data) for acute and chronic toxicity, to establish a safe level for human health. There is not a high probability of health risk for consumers if the modelled values are equal or lower than the reference data. The modelling starts with a conservative approach (e.g. consumers do not wash and/or cook the products) which may result in an overestimation of the actual toxicity of the respective pesticide.

=== Results of recent (2015) Maximum Residue Level monitoring ===
Recent results of the European monitoring programme were presented by EFSA (The 2015 European Union report on pesticide residues in food). The data was collected from the responsible authorities of the Member States and subsequently assessed and analysed by EFSA.

When looking at the pesticide residue levels, EFSA compared the analysed samples with the maximum residue level values previously established by the European Commission. The samples were taken from 11 different food products (aubergines, bananas, broccoli, virgin olive oil, orange juice, peas without pods, sweet peppers, table grapes, wheat, butter, and eggs).

The samples were collected from food products, produced both within and outside the EU, and pesticides that were analysed included compounds that are banned in the EU (e.g. Dichlorvos).

In 97.2% of the samples, there were residue levels below the determined Maximum Residue Limit. No detectable residues were found in 53.3% of the samples, while 43.9% contained residues but did not exceed the MRL, and 2.8% contained residues that exceeded the MRL. The countries reporting data to EFSA analysed a total of 84,341 samples for 774 different pesticides, with variety between countries and test-sites.

EFSA concluded that there was a negligible risk for short term (acute) exposure of pesticide residues in food, and overall a low risk for human health consequences.

The long term (chronic) exposure assessment showed that the estimated exposure did not exceed the acceptable daily intake values (ADI) for any of the tested pesticides except for dichlorvos, which is not allowed to be used as a pesticide in the EU.

=== Monitoring of pesticides in the environment ===
The concentrations of pesticides alongside other chemical substances that pose a significant risk to the environment or to human health in surface waters in the European Union are limited to Environmental Quality Standards. These are defined in the Directive on Environmental Quality Standards in the Field of Water Policy. This Directive covers a total of 45 priority substances as defined by the Water Framework Directive and 8 additional pollutants. Environmental Quality Standards set limits to the average annual concentration as well as the maximum allowable concentrations for short-term exposure and differentiates inland surface waters (rivers and lakes) and other surface waters (transitional, coastal, and territorial waters). It is the responsibility of the Member States to establish monitoring programmes for Environmental Quality Standards and to incorporate these into river basin management plans.

The Directive on Environmental Quality Standards was amended by Directive 2013/39/EU to establish a watch list of substances for monitoring and future prioritisation containing up to 10 substances, which include three pharmaceutical substances (Diclofenac, 17-beta-Estradiol (E2) and 17-alpha-Ethinylestradiol (EE2)).

Pesticides included in Directive on Environmental Quality Standards are to a large extent banned and not used in Europe. Reported data are sparse due to the geographic extent and the large quantity of different chemical substances used as pesticides in agriculture. However, there is a variety of pesticide monitoring programmes within the European Union, independently of EU regulatory frameworks. A 2014 review of organic chemicals (including pesticides) in surface waters in Europe concluded that there was concern for acute lethal effects in 14% and for chronic long-term effects in 42% of the 4,000 monitoring sites.
