= Pesticide drift =

Diffusion of pesticides into the environment

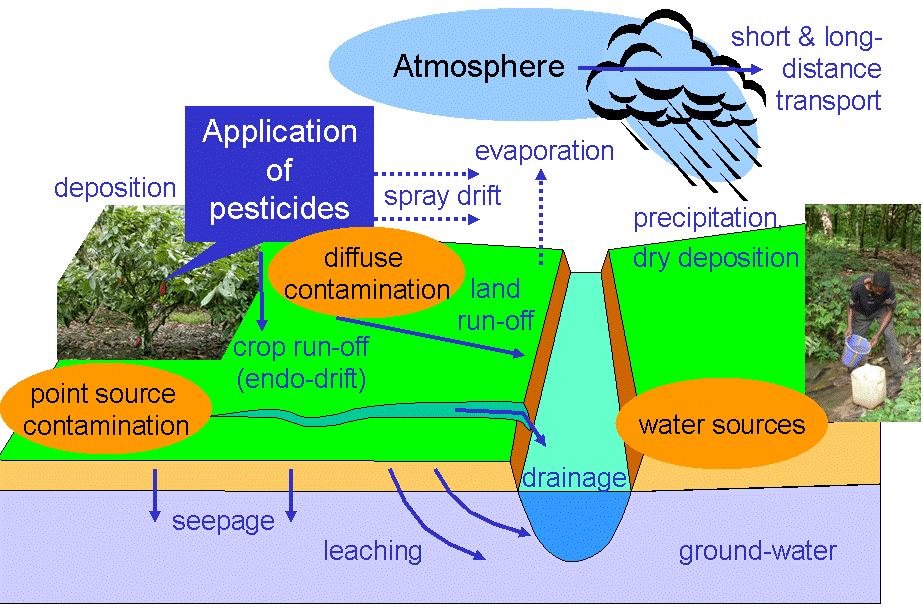
Possible sinks of pesticide drift-caused environmental contamination

Pesticide drift, also known as spray drift, is the unintentional diffusion of pesticides toward nontarget species. It is one of the most negative effects of pesticide application. Drift can damage human health, environment, and crops. Together with runoff and leaching, drift is a mechanism for agricultural pollution. Some drift results from contamination of sprayer tanks.

Farmers struggle to minimize pesticide drift and remain productive. Research continues on developing pesticides that are more selective, but the current pesticides have been highly optimized.

== Pesticide application ==
Pesticides are commonly applied by the use of mechanical sprayers. Sprayers convert a pesticide formulation, often consisting of a mixture of water, the pesticide, and other components (adjuvants, for example) into droplets, which are applied as evenly as possible to the targeted crop. Because components of the mist are highly mobile, spray drift can occur, especially for smaller droplets. Some pesticides mists are visible, appearing cloud-like, while others can be invisible and odorless.

The quality of sprayer equipment affects drift problems. Sprayer tanks contaminated with another herbicide are one source of drift. With placement (localised) spraying of broad spectrum pesticides, considerable efforts have been made to quantify and control spray drift from hydraulic nozzles.

"Drift retardants" are compounds added to the spray mixture to suppress pesticide drift. A typical retardant is polyacrylamide. These polymers suppress the formation of tiny droplets.

Weather conditions and timing affect the drift problem. The efficiency of the spray and reach of the spray drift can be computed. In addition to weather, windbreaks can mitigate the effects of drift. Other ways to mitigate spray drift is to apply the pesticide directly to the desired treatment area, as well as paying attention to where surface waters, gutters, drainage ditches, and storm drains are located. This is to make sure that the pesticide is applied in a way that prevents it from getting in to these spaces.

Most herbicides are organic compounds of low volatility, unlike fumigants, which are usually gases. Several are salts and others have boiling points above 100 °C (Dicamba is a solid that melts at 114°C). Thus, drift often entails mobilization of droplets, which can be very small. The contribution from their volatility, low as they are, cannot be ignored, either.

A distinction has been made between "exo-drift" (the transfer of spray out of the target area) and endo-drift, where the active ingredient (AI) in droplets falls into the target area, but does not reach the biological target. "Endo-drift" is volumetrically more significant and may therefore cause greater ecological contamination (e.g. where chemical pesticides pollute ground water). Since drift can be problematic, alternative weed-control technologies have evolved. A topical approach is integrated pest management, which involves fewer chemicals but often greater manual work.

=== Useful drift ===
Wind drift can be an efficient mechanism for moving droplets to their targets over a wide area with ultra-low volume (ULV) spraying: for example, with locust control, or spraying crops where water is scarce. Appropriate (often rotary) nozzles are used to achieve Controlled Droplet Application (CDA), maximising a droplet size range suitable for travelling limited distances down-wind, before hitting their targets.

=== Dicamba drift ===
Chemical structure of Dicamba, 3,6-dichloro-2-methoxybenzoic acid

Dicamba drift is a particular problem, as has been recognized since at least 1979. The effects have been noted for many crops: grapes, tomatoes, soybeans. In 2017, Dicamba-resistant soybeans and cotton were approved for use in the US. This new technology worsened the drift problem because these farmers could use Dicamba more freely.

Although already low in volatility, as discussed above, Dicamba can be made even less volatile by conversion to various salts. The approach entails treatment of Dicamba with amines, which form ammonium salts. These salts are described by their acronyms BAPMA-Dicamba and DGA-Dicamba. Although these salts are of lower volatility in laboratory tests, in the field the situation is more complicated, and drift remains a problem.

== Safety and society ==
Much public concern has led to research into spray drift, point source pollution (e.g. pesticides entering bodies of water following spillage of concentrate or rinsate) can also cause environmental harm. Public concern for pesticide drift is not met with regulatory response. Farm workers and communities surrounding large farms are at a high risk of coming in contact with pesticides. People in agricultural areas are at risk for increased genotoxicity because of pesticide drift.

Insecticides sprayed on crop fields can also have detrimental effects on non-human lifeforms that are important to the surrounding ecosystems like bees and other insects.

The seriousness of crop injury caused by dicamba drift is increasingly being recognized. For example, the American Soybean Association and various land-grant universities are cooperating in the race to find ways to preserve the usability of dicamba while ending drift injury. Application of herbicides later in the season to protect herbicide-resistant genetically modified plants increases the risk of volatilisation as the temperature is higher and incorporation into the soil impractical.

From 1998 to 2006, Environmental Health Perspectives found nearly 3,000 cases of pesticide drift; nearly half were workers on the fields treated with pesticides and 14% of cases were children under the age of 15.

=== Health concerns ===
Bystander exposure describes the event when individuals unintentionally come in contact with airborne pesticides. Bystanders include workers working in an area separate to the pesticide application area, individuals living in the surrounding areas of an application area, or individuals passing by fields as they are being treated with a pesticide.

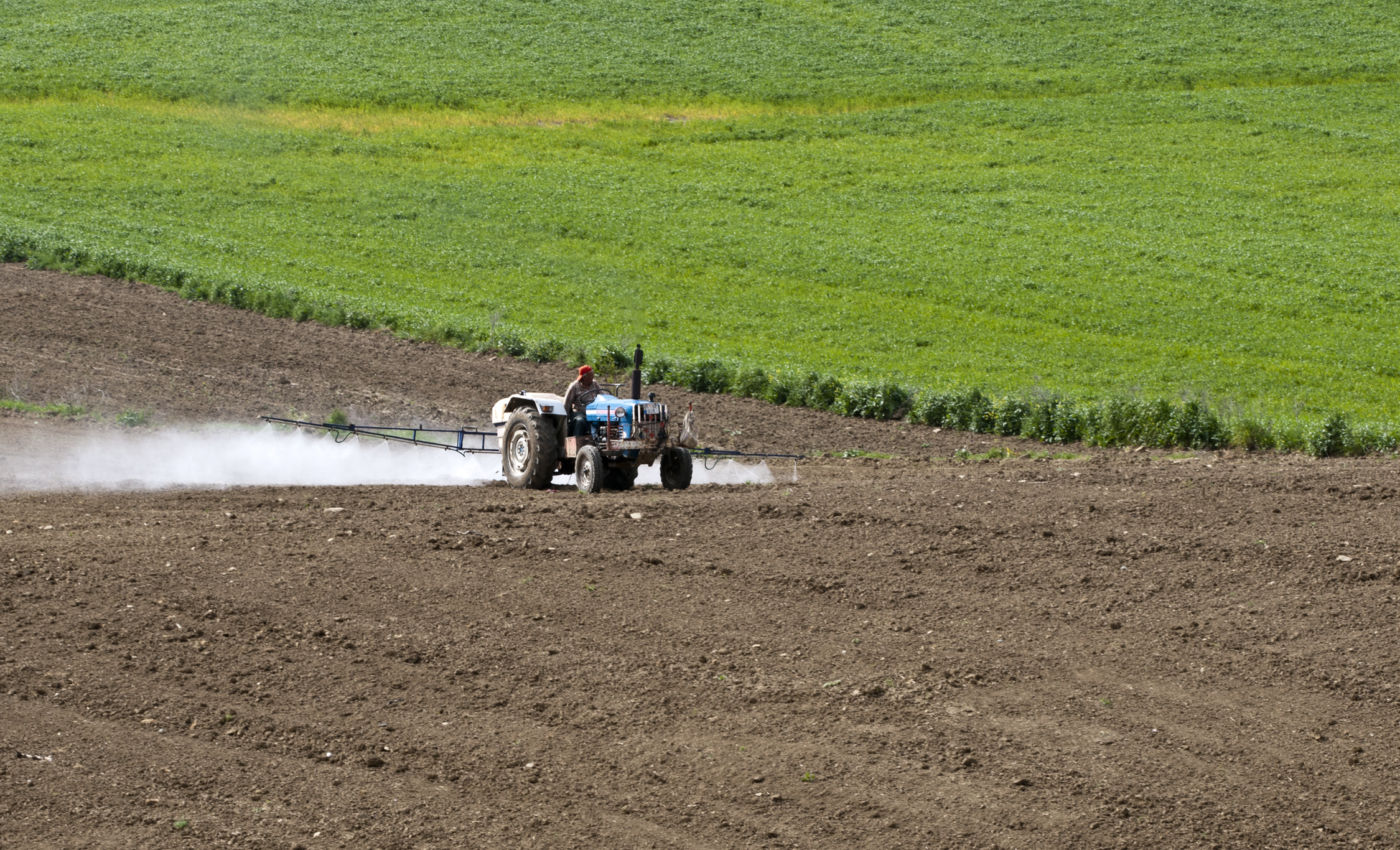
Pesticide application

Different pesticides can affect different body systems, inflicting different symptoms. Pesticides can have long-term negative health impacts, including cancer, lung diseases, fertility and reproductive problems, and neurodevelopmental issues in children, when exposure levels are high enough.

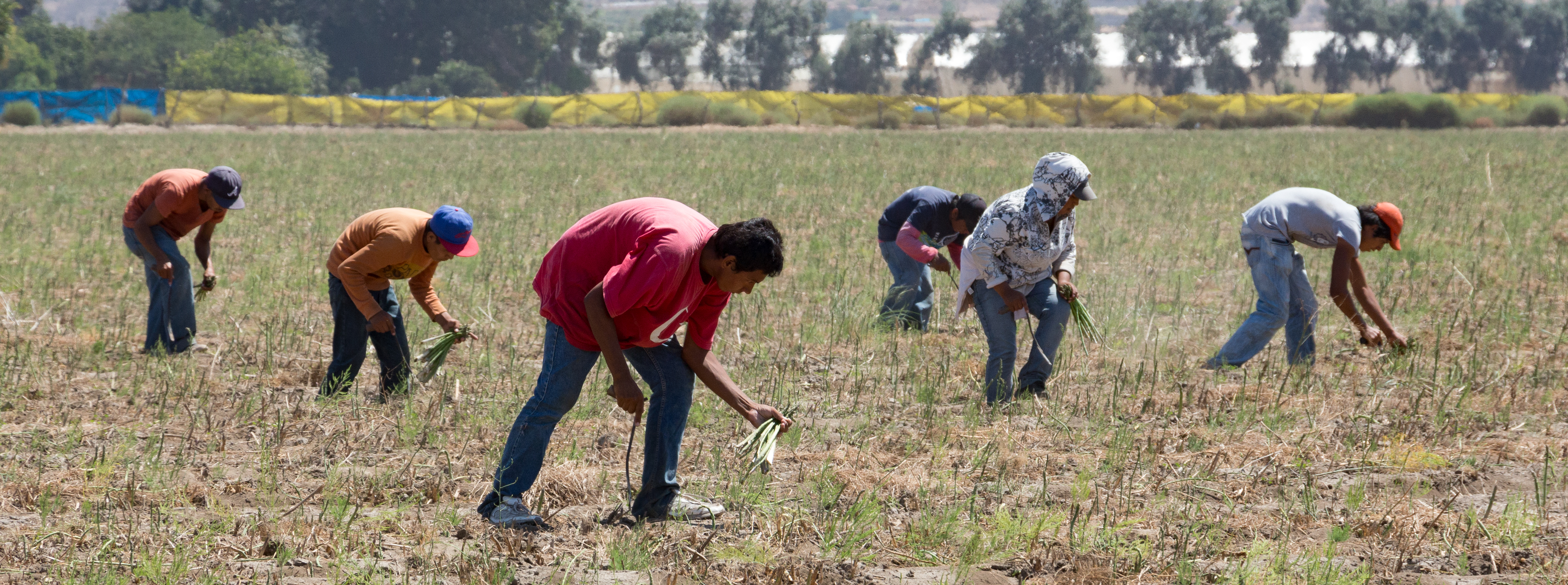
Farmworkers, disproportionately of the Latinx community, experience pesticide drift frequently as a work hazard.

=== Regulations ===
In 2001, the United States Environmental Protection Agency published a guidance to "manufacturers, formulators, and registrants of pesticide products" (EPA 2001) that stated the EPA's stance against pesticide drift as well as suggested product labelling practices.

To try and reduce pesticide drift, the EPA is a part of several initiatives. The EPA has routine pesticide risk assessments to check potential drift impact on farmworkers living near or on fields where crops are grown, farmworkers, water sources, and the environment. The USDA and EPA are working together to examine new studies and how to improve scientific models to estimate the exposure, risk, and drift of pesticides. The EPA is also working with pesticide manufacturers to ensure labels are easy to read, contain the correct application process and DRT for that specific pesticide.

== See also ==
- Aerial application
- Agricultural runoff
- Environmental impact of agriculture
- Environmental protection
- Nonpoint source pollution
- Environmental effects of pesticides

== Notes ==
- Himel, C.M. (1974). "Analytical methodology in ULV". Pesticide application by ULV methods. British Crop Protection Council Monograph No. 11. pp. 112–119. OCLC 16299124.
- Matthews G.A. (2006) Pesticides: Health, Safety and the Environment Blackwell, Oxford
