= QuEChERS =

Solid phase extraction method

QuEChERS is a solid phase extraction method for detection of biocide residues in food. The name is a portmanteau word formed from "quick, easy, cheap, effective, rugged, and safe".

== Technique ==
The sample (fruits, vegetables, tobacco, etc.) is homogenized and centrifuged with a reagent and agitated for 1 minute. The reagents used depend on the type of sample to be analyzed. Following this, the sample is put through a dispersive solid phase extraction cleanup prior to analysis by gas-liquid chromatography or liquid-liquid chromatography.

Samples prepared using the QuEChERS method can be processed more quickly using a homogenization instrument. Such instruments can homogenize the food sample in a centrifuge tube, then agitate the sample with the reagent of choice, before moving the extracted sample for centrifuging. By using such an instrument, the samples can be moved through the QuEChERS method more quickly.

Some modifications to the original QuEChERS method had to be introduced to ensure efficient extraction of pH-dependent compounds (e.g., phenoxyalkanoic acids), to minimize degradation of susceptible compounds (e.g., base and acid labile pesticides) and to expand the spectrum of matrices covered.

== Applications ==
The QuEChERS method has been readily accepted by many pesticide residue analysts.
