= Maximum residue limit =

The maximum residue limit (also maximum residue level, MRL) is the maximum amount of pesticide residue that is expected to remain on food products when a pesticide is used according to label directions, that will not be a concern to human health.

== Determination ==
The MRL is usually determined by repeated (on the order of 10) field trials, where the crop has been treated according to good agricultural practice (GAP) and an appropriate pre harvest interval or withholding period has elapsed. For many pesticides this is set at the limit of determination (LOD) – since only major pesticides have been evaluated and understanding of acceptable daily intake (ADI) is incomplete (i.e. producers or public bodies have not submitted MRL data – often because these were not required in the past). LOD can be considered a measure of presence/absence, but certain residues may not be quantifiable at very low levels. For this reason the limit of quantification (LOQ) is often used instead of the LOD. As a rule of thumb the LOQ is approximately two times the LOD. For substances that are not included in any of the annexes in EU regulations, a default MRL of 0.01 mg/kg normally applies.

It follows that adoption of GAP at the farm level must be a priority, and includes the withdrawal of obsolete pesticides. With increasingly sensitive detection equipment, a certain amount of pesticide residue will often be measured following field use. In the current regulatory environment, it would be wise for cocoa producers to focus only on pest control agents that are permitted for use in the EU and US. It should be stressed that MRLs are set on the basis of observations and not on ADIs.

=== In medicinal plants ===
If MRL of some medicinal plant is not known it is calculated by the formula:

$$MRL= ADI*W/MDI*100*SF$$

where SF is the safety factor

- MDI is the mean daily intake
- W is the body weight
- ADI is the acceptable daily intake

== Ornamental crops ==
In some cases in the EU MRL's are also used for ornamental produce, and checked against MRL's for food crops. While this is a sound approach for the general environmental impact, it doesn't reflect potential exposure of people handling ornamentals. A swap test can eliminate this gap. MRL's for ornamental produce can sometimes result in a conflicting outcome because of the absence of pre harvest intervals (PHI) or withholding periods for ornamentals, specifically in crops where harvesting is continuous, like roses. This happens when a grower is following the label recommendations and the produce is sampled shortly after.

== MRL in the EU ==
Three key points are taken into consideration regarding MRL values in the EU regulation: 1) the amounts of residues found in food must be safe for consumers and must be as low as possible, 2) the European Commission fixes MRLs for all food and animal feed, and 3) the MRLs for all crops and all pesticides can be found in the MRL database on the Commission website.

== See also ==
- Detection limits
- Maximum contaminant level
- Pesticides
- QuEChERS – method for testing pesticide residues
