= Erik Rotheim =

Norwegian engineer (1898–1938)

Erik Andreas Rotheim (19 September 1898 – 18 September 1938) was a Norwegian professional chemical engineer and inventor. He is best known for invention of the first aerosol spray can and valve that could hold and dispense fluids.

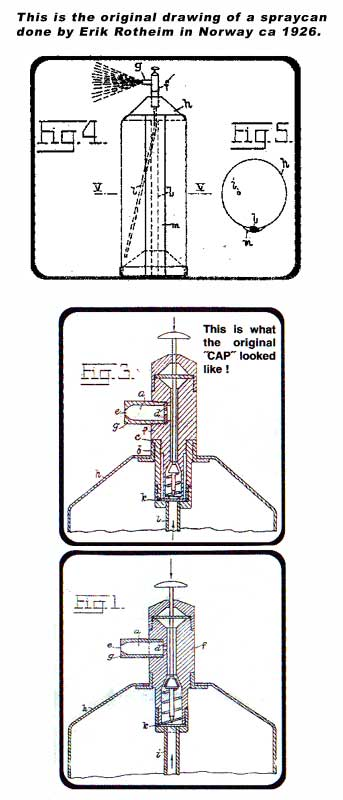
Erik Rotheim's drawing of an aerosol spray can

== Biography ==
Erik Rotheim was born in Kristiania (now Oslo), Norway. He earned his engineering degree in Switzerland. In 1921, he graduated as a chemistry engineer at ETH Zürich with electrochemistry as a specialty. Later he attended Karlsruhe Institute of Technology for further education.

== Inventions ==
He established his own company in Oslo during 1925. He submitted an application for an aerosol spray can in October 1926. The can could dispense different fluids using a chemical propellant. The Norwegian patent was granted in June 1929. He filed the United States patent application on 30 September 1927 and it was approved on 7 April 1931.

In 1927, he demonstrated the Invention to paint manufacturer Alf Bjercke. The following year Rotheim negotiated an agreement for the use of his patent with paints, varnishes and liquid bean waxes, but commercial success was initially limited. In 1931, a separate foundation, Rotheim Spraying System, was formed for the exploitation of patent rights in the international market. Rotheim died in 1938 and the following year the company that produced the product went bankrupt. After Rotheim's death technological advancements made significant advances with its incorporation into various products including the airbrush and Aerosol paint.

The patent was sold to an American company for 100,000 kr. Commercial exploitation of the patent was not significant until it was introduced in the United States in the 1940s. Improvements to the underlying principle of the spray head by Americans Lyle D. Goodhue and William N. Sullivan allowed the technology to be further adapted, first with the Aerosol bomb for insect control, and later in various other applications. In 1949, Robert Abplanalp files the first aerosol valve patent which was issued by the United States Patent and Trademark Office in 1953.

== Legacy ==
Norway Post celebrated Rotheim's invention by issuing a commemorative stamp in 1998.
