= SENSOR-Pesticides =

US States watching for illness and injury

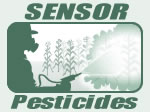
SENSOR-Pesticides Logo

Sentinel Event Notification System for Occupational Risks (SENSOR)-Pesticides is a U.S. state-based surveillance program that monitors pesticide-related illness and injury. It is administered by the National Institute for Occupational Safety and Health (NIOSH), twelve state health agencies participate. NIOSH provides technical support to all participating states. It also provides funding to some states, in conjunction with the US Environmental Protection Agency (US EPA).

Pesticide-related illness is a significant occupational health issue, but it is believed to be underreported. Because of this, NIOSH proposed the SENSOR program to track pesticide poisonings. Because workers in many industries are at risk for pesticide exposure, and public concern exists regarding the use of and exposure to pesticides, government and regulatory authorities experience pressure to monitor health effects associated with them. SENSOR-Pesticides state partners collect case data from several different sources using a standard case definition and set of variables. This information is then forwarded to the program headquarters at NIOSH where it is compiled and put into a national database.

Researchers and government officials from the SENSOR-Pesticides program have published research articles that highlight findings from the data and their implications for environmental and occupational pesticide issues. These issues include eradication of invasive species, pesticide poisoning in schools, birth defects, and residential use of total release foggers, or "bug bombs," which are devices that release an insecticide mist.

== Background ==
Although it is a significant occupational health issue, work-related pesticide poisoning is believed to be underreported. Before the SENSOR program began, state programs that collected reports of occupational diseases did not usually conduct interventions. While over 25 states required reporting of pesticide-related illness, most of them could not compile useful information on incidence or prevalence. In response to these challenges, NIOSH proposed the SENSOR program as a model to track certain occupational conditions, including pesticides.

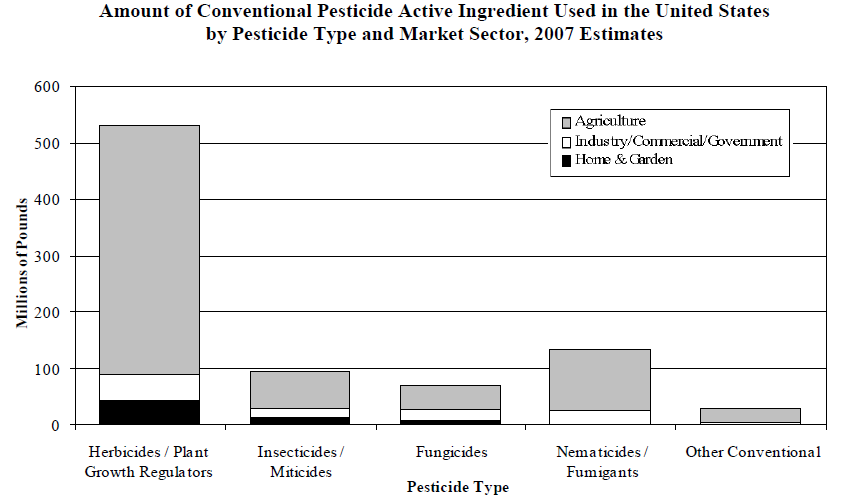
Pesticide usage in the U.S., 2007.

Pesticide poisoning is an important occupational health issue because pesticides are used in a large number of industries, which puts many different categories of workers at risk. From 1995 to 2001, use in agriculture accounted for at least 70% of conventional pesticide use in the U.S., and the US EPA estimates that the agricultural sector has had a similar market share of pesticides since 1979. Pesticides are particularly useful in agriculture because they increase crop yields and reduce the need for manual labor. However, this extensive use puts agricultural workers at increased risk for pesticide illnesses. Workers in other industries are at risk for exposure as well. For example, commercial availability of pesticides in stores puts retail workers at risk for exposure and illness when they handle pesticide products. The ubiquity of pesticides puts emergency responders such as fire-fighters and police officers at risk, because they are often the first responders to emergency events and may be unaware of the presence of a poisoning hazard. The process of aircraft disinsection, in which pesticides are used on inbound international flights for insect and disease control, can also make flight attendants sick.

The widespread use of pesticides, their release into the environment, and the potential for adverse public health effects due to exposure may raise public concern. Some feel that regulatory authorities have an ethical obligation to track the health effects of such chemicals. In the Handbook of Pesticide Toxicology, Calvert et al. write "[b]ecause society allows pesticides to be disseminated into the environment, society also incurs the obligation to track the health effects of pesticides." Jay Vroom, president of CropLife America, said in a press release that "...our industry has a moral and ethical obligation...to know how these products impact humans." Surveillance of pesticide-related injuries and illnesses is recommended by the American Medical Association, the Council of State and Territorial Epidemiologists (CSTE), the Pew Environmental Health Commission, and the Government Accountability Office.

== History ==
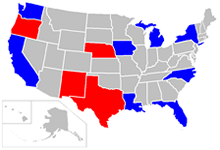
Map of SENSOR-Pesticides program participation by State - as of 2013 States receiving federal funding for participation Unfunded program partners

Beginning in 1987, NIOSH supported the implementation of the Sentinel Event Notification System for Occupational Risks (SENSOR) program in ten state health departments. The objectives of the program were to help state health departments develop and refine reporting systems for certain occupational disorders so that they could conduct and evaluate interventions and prevention efforts. The disorders covered by SENSOR included silicosis, occupational asthma, carpal tunnel syndrome, lead poisoning, and pesticide poisoning. While each participating state health department had previously done surveillance or interventions for some of these occupational illnesses, SENSOR helped the states to develop and refine their reporting systems and programs.

The original SENSOR-Pesticides model was based on physician reporting. Each state contacted a select group of sentinel health care professionals on a regular basis to collect information. However, this system was labor-intensive and did not yield many cases. Because different states used different methods for collecting information, their data could not be compiled or compared to analyze for trends. In response, NIOSH, along with other federal agencies (US EPA, National Center for Environmental Health), non-federal agencies (CSTE, Association of Occupational and Environmental Clinics), and state health departments, developed a standard case definition and a set of standardized variables. As of 2013, SENSOR-Pesticides had 12 participating states contributing occupational pesticide-related injury and illness data: California, Florida, Iowa, Louisiana, Michigan, New York, North Carolina, and Washington received federal funding to support surveillance activities, while Nebraska, New Mexico, Oregon, and Texas were unfunded SENSOR-Pesticides program partners.

== Case definition ==
A case of pesticide-related illness or injury is characterized by an acute onset of symptoms that are temporally related to a pesticide exposure. Cases are classified as occupational if exposure occurs at work, unless the case was a suicide or an attempted suicide.

Cases are reportable when:

- there is documentation of new adverse health effects temporally related to a documented pesticide exposure AND
- there is consistent evidence of a causal relationship between the pesticide and the health effects based on the known toxicology of the pesticide OR
- there is not enough information to determine whether there is a causal relationship between the exposure and the health effects.

State public health officials rate each case as definite, probable, possible or suspicious. Illness severity is assigned as low, moderate, severe, or fatal.

== Data collection ==
All states in the program require physicians to report pesticide-related injuries and illnesses; however, most states collect the majority of their data from workers’ compensation claims, poison control centers, and state agencies with jurisdiction over pesticide use, such as state departments of agriculture. When they receive a report, health department officials review the information to determine whether it was pesticide related. If it was, they request medical records and try to interview the patient (or a proxy) and anyone else involved in the incident (e.g. supervisors, applicators, and witnesses). The data is compiled each year and put into a national database.

In addition to identifying, classifying, and tabulating pesticide poisoning cases, the states periodically investigate pesticide-related events and develop interventions aimed at particular industries or pesticide hazards.

== Impact ==
Federal and state-level scientists and researchers with SENSOR-Pesticides have published articles on pesticide exposure events and trends using program data. These articles include MMWR publications and articles in peer-reviewed journals on exposures such as acute pesticide-related illness in youth, agricultural workers, retail workers, migrant farm workers, and flight attendants. Several articles have attracted media attention and motivated legislative or other governmental action.

=== Florida Medfly Eradication Program ===
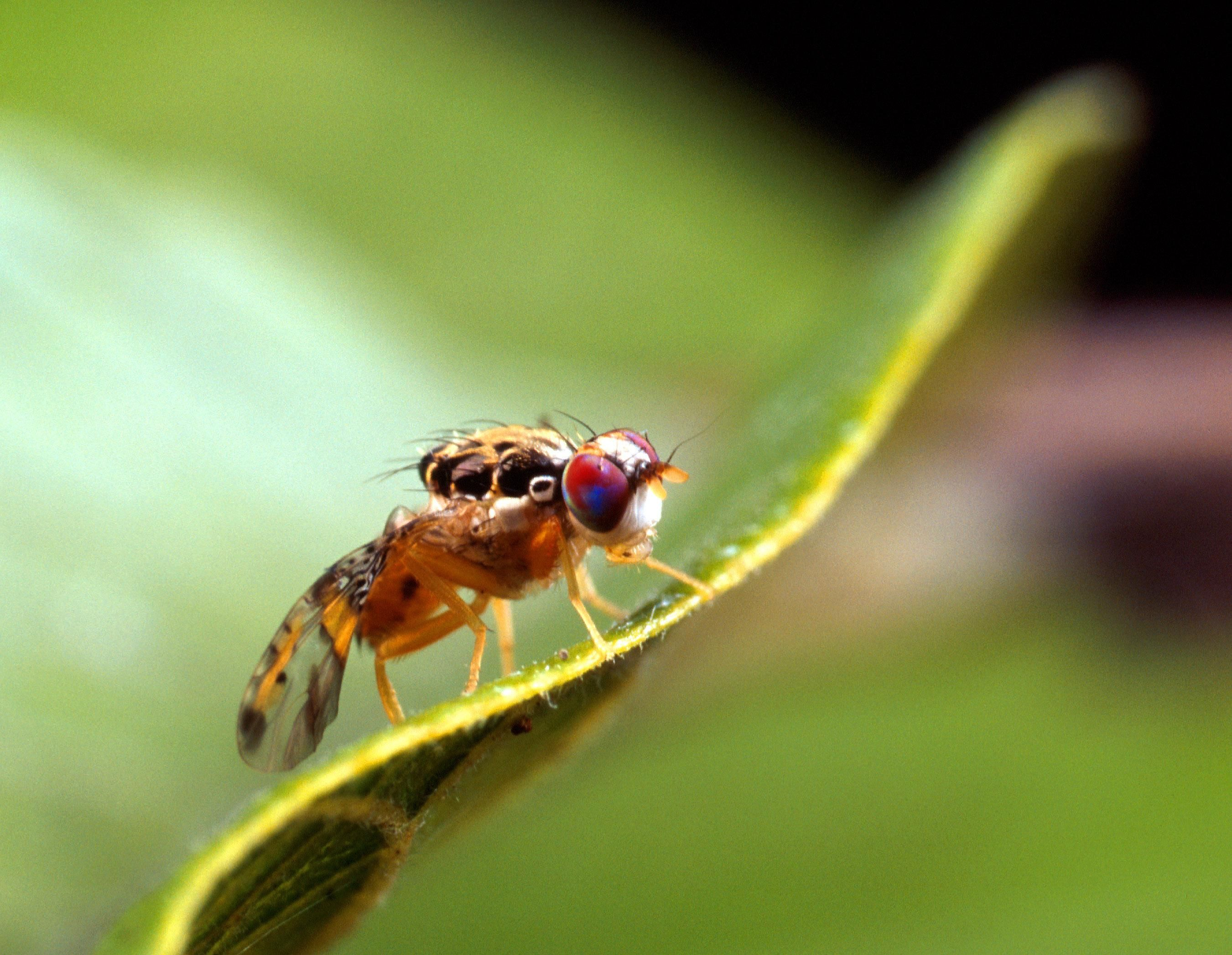
Ceratitis capitata, the Mediterranean fruit fly (Medfly)

In response to a Mediterranean fruit fly (also known as “Medfly”) outbreak, officials from the Florida Department of Agriculture sprayed pesticides (primarily malathion) and bait over five counties during the spring and summer of 1998. Scientists from the University of Florida’s Institute of Food and Agricultural Sciences stated that malathion was being sprayed in a manner that did not pose a significant risk to public health. During the eradication effort, the Florida Department of Health investigated 230 cases of illness that were attributed to the pesticide. Officials from the Florida Department of Health and the SENSOR-Pesticides program published an article in Centers for Disease Control and Prevention (CDC) Morbidity and Mortality Weekly Report (MMWR) that described these case reports and recommended alternative methods for Medfly control, including exclusion activities at ports of entry to prevent importation, more rapid detection through increased sentinel trapping densities, and the release of sterile male flies to interrupt the reproductive cycle. The United States Department of Agriculture (USDA) incorporated these suggestions into their 2001 Environmental Impact Statement on the Fruit Fly Cooperative Control Program. These impact statements guide the USDA's development of insect control strategies and decisions.

=== Pesticides in schools ===
Researchers from the SENSOR-Pesticides program published an article in 2005 in the Journal of the American Medical Association (JAMA) on pesticide poisoning in schools. The article, which included data collected by SENSOR, described illnesses in students and school employees associated with pesticide exposures. The study found that rates of pesticide-related illnesses in children rose significantly from 1998 to 2002 and called for a reduction in pesticide use to prevent pesticide-related illness on or near school grounds. The article generated media coverage and drew attention to pesticide safety in schools and to safer alternatives to pesticides through integrated pest management (IPM). "[T]he study does provide evidence that using pesticides at schools is not innocuous and that there are better ways to use pesticides," said study co-author Dr. Geoffrey Calvert. Officials in organizations supporting the pesticide industry, such as CropLife America and RISE (Responsible Industry for a Sound Environment, a trade association representing pesticide manufacturers and suppliers), reacted strongly to the report, calling it “alarmist” and “incomplete” in its health reporting. CropLife America president Jay Vroom claimed that the report was “written without context about the proper use of pesticides in schools and [did] not mention the positive public health protections they provide" and stated that pesticide use in schools is "well regulated" and can be managed so that the risk is low. RISE president Allen James faulted the article for relying on unverified reports and said that evidence suggested that such incidents were extremely rare. The increased awareness of pesticide use in schools influenced parents and other stakeholders in numerous states to call for the adoption of integrated pest management programs. According to the National Pest Management Association, three more states passed IPM rules or laws between October 2005 and October 2008.

=== Birth defects in Florida and North Carolina ===
In February 2005, three infants were born with birth defects to migrant farmworkers within eight weeks of each other in Collier County, Florida. Because one of the mothers had worked in North Carolina and the other two worked in Florida, neither state's health department attributed the cluster to pesticide exposure at first. However, when they presented their findings at the annual SENSOR-Pesticides workshop in 2006, they realized that all three mothers worked for the same tomato grower during the period of organogenesis while pregnant, and that they may have been exposed to pesticides. The state health departments reported the cluster to their respective state agricultural departments. The Florida Department of Agriculture and Consumer Services inspected the grower's farms in Florida and fined the company $111,200 for violations they discovered; the North Carolina Department of Agriculture and Consumer Services conducted a similar inspection of farms in North Carolina and fined the company $184,500. After the investigation, North Carolina Governor Mike Easley assembled the “Governor’s Task Force on Preventing Agricultural Pesticide Exposure.” It presented its findings in April 2008, which caused the state legislature to pass anti-retaliation and recordkeeping laws, training mandates to protect the health of agricultural workers, and funding for improved surveillance. In Florida, the state legislature added ten new pesticide inspectors to the Florida Department of Agriculture and Consumer Services.

=== Total release foggers ===
Total release foggers (TRFs), or "bug bombs," release a fog of insecticide to kill bugs in a room and coat surfaces with a chemical so the insects do not return. It is estimated that 50 million TRFs are used in the US annually. SENSOR-Pesticides federal and state staff, along with officials from the California Department of Pesticide Regulation (CDPR), published an article in the CDC MMWR that called attention to injuries and illnesses resulting from use of total release foggers. The New York State Department of Environmental Conservation (DEC) published a press release in response, stating that the state would restrict their use. DEC Commissioner Pete Granis announced that the department would move to classify foggers as a restricted-use product in New York State, meaning that only certified pesticide applicators would be able to obtain them. In March 2010, US EPA announced required label changes on indoor TRF products that reflect the label change recommendations made in the MMWR article.
