= Fogger =

Device that creates fog

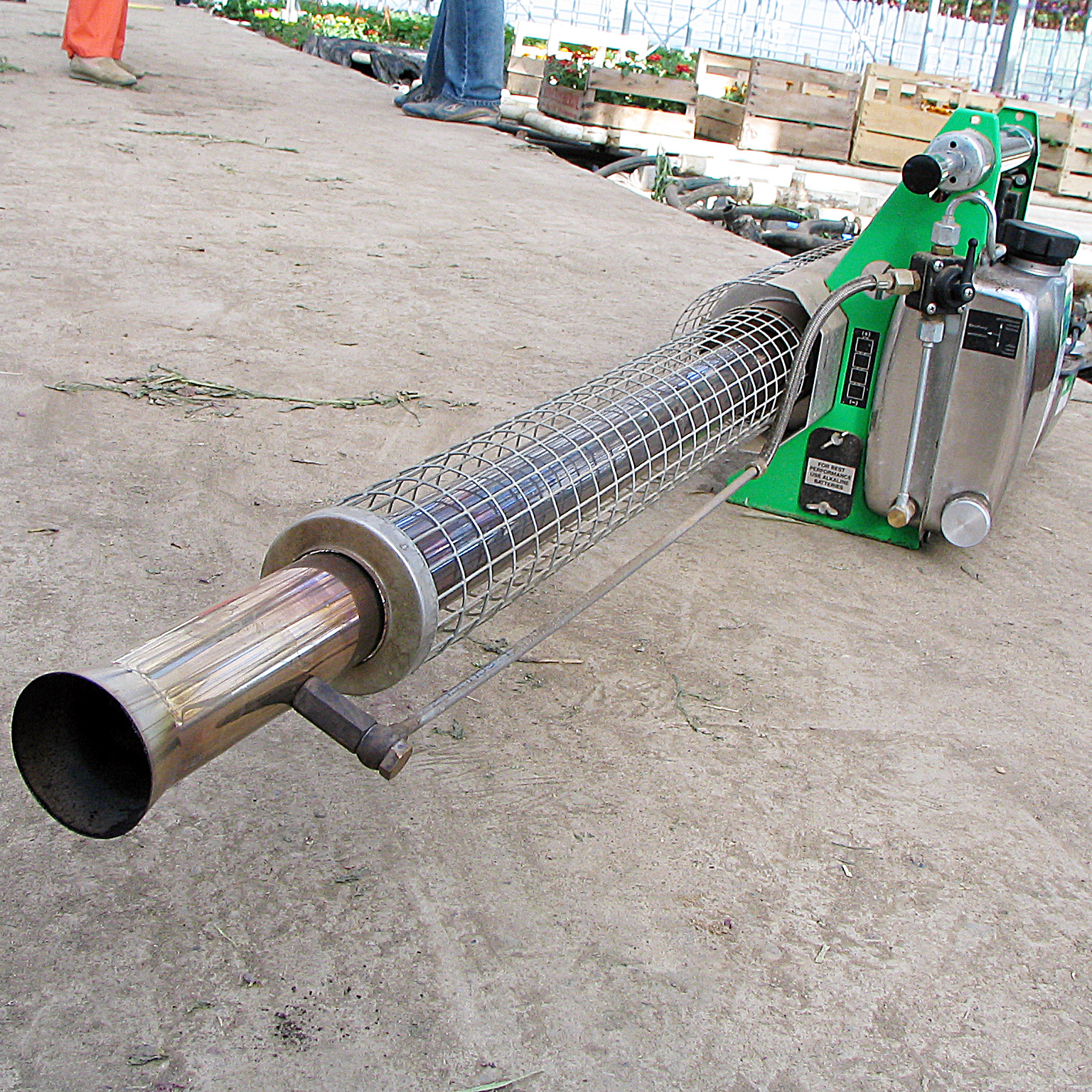
Thermal Fog Generator

A fogger or bug bomb is any device that creates a fog by releasing their contents at once to fumigate an area. Foggers typically contain a pesticide or an insecticide such as aerosol propellants for killing insects and other arthropods. Foggers are often used by consumers as a low cost alternative to professional pest control services. The number of foggers needed for pest control depends on the size of the space to be treated, as stated for safety reasons on the instructions supplied with the devices. The fog may contain flammable gases, leading to a danger of explosion if a fogger is used in a building with a pilot light or other naked flame.

== Fogger composition ==
Total release foggers (TRFs) (also called "bug bombs") are used to kill cockroaches, fleas, and flying insects by filling an area with insecticide. Most foggers contain pyrethroid, pyrethrin, or both as active ingredients. Pyrethroids are a class of synthetic insecticides that are chemically similar to natural pyrethrins and have low potential for systemic toxicity in mammals. Pyrethrins are insecticides derived from chrysanthemum flowers (pyrethrum). Piperonyl butoxide and n-octyl bicycloheptene dicarboximide often are added to pyrethrin products to inhibit insects' microsomal enzymes that detoxify pyrethrins. To distribute their insecticide, foggers also contain aerosol propellants.

== Hazards to humans ==
During 2001-2006, a total of 466 fogger-related illnesses or injuries were identified in the United States by the SENSOR-Pesticides program. These illnesses or injuries often resulted from inability or failure to vacate before the fogger discharged, reentry into the treated space too soon after the fogger was discharged, excessive use of foggers for the space being treated, and failure to notify others nearby.

=== Exposure symptoms ===
Pyrethrins have little systemic toxicity in mammals, but they have been reported to induce contact dermatitis, conjunctivitis, and asthma. Signs and symptoms of pyrethroid toxicity include abnormal skin sensation (e.g., burning, itching, tingling, and numbness), dizziness, salivation, headache, fatigue, vomiting, diarrhea, seizure, irritability to sound and touch, and other central nervous system effects.

== See also ==
- Ultrasonic hydroponic fogger, a device used in agriculture
- Pyrethrin Toxicity
