= William N. Sullivan =

American entomologist

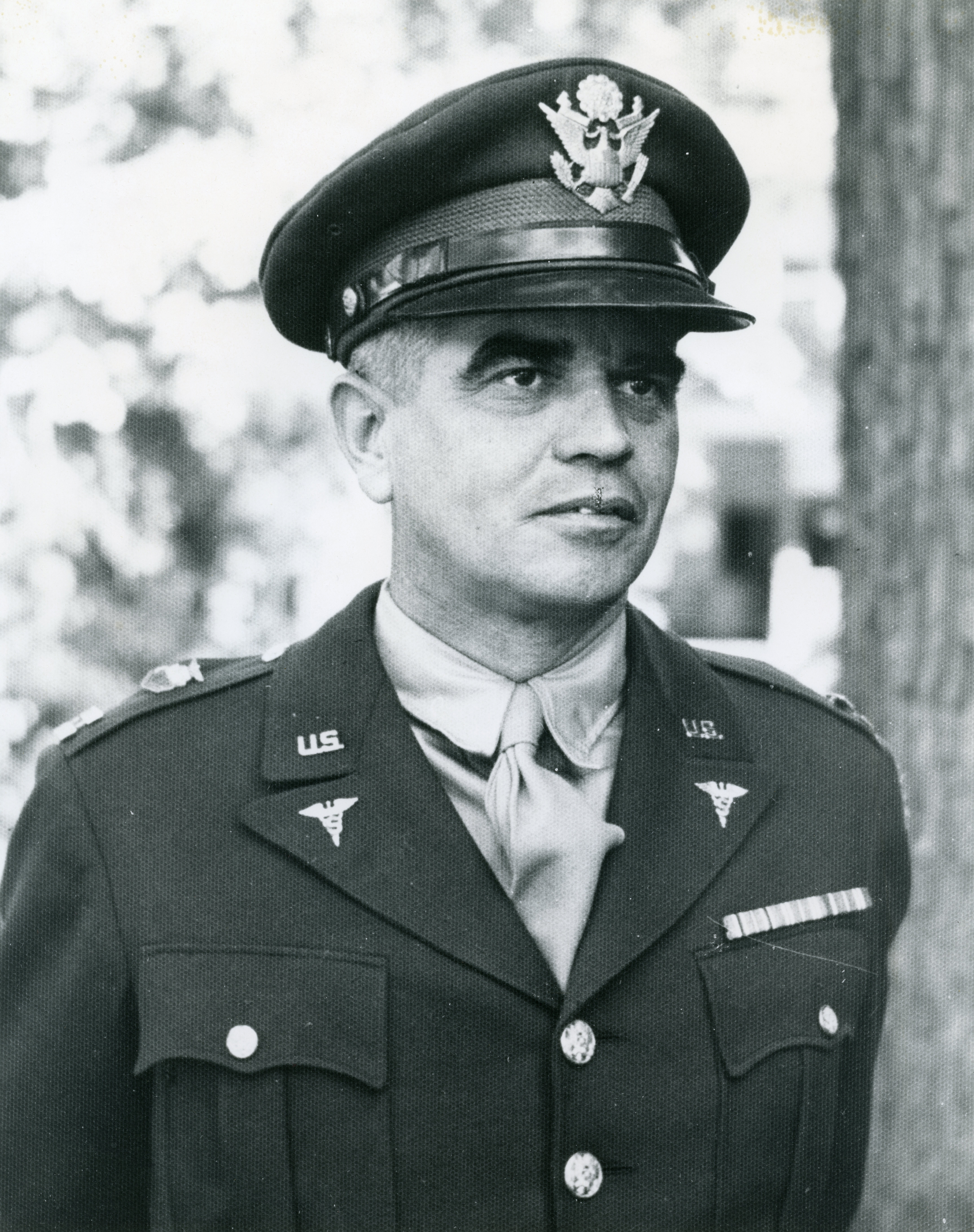
William N. Sullivan, Captain U.S. Army Air Force, Circa 1943

William N. Sullivan (June 23, 1908 – March 2, 1979) was an American entomologist who is widely credited with co-inventing the aerosol bomb or "bug bomb," with Lyle D. Goodhue, while employed by the United States Department of Agriculture. The "bug bomb" was developed for aircraft disinsection through the dispersion of insecticide for controlling mosquitoes. The invention proved invaluable in the Pacific Theater during World War II where it was used extensively to control the spread of insect borne disease - primarily malaria - which was causing far more casualties than actual combat.

== Personal life and education ==
Sullivan was born on June 23, 1908, in Lawrence, Massachusetts, one of eight children born to Katherine (Lynch) and William N. Sullivan, Sr. between 1898 and 1910. Three of his siblings died at young ages; Katherine as a toddler of unknown causes, Frances as an infant of whooping cough, and Mary at age 20 of tuberculosis.

William received his early education in the public schools of Lawrence, graduating from Lawrence High School in 1926. He earned a Bachelor of Science degree in 1930 from Massachusetts Agricultural College (MAC), now the University of Massachusetts Amherst and then a Master of Science degree (Entomology Major) in 1939, also from the University of Massachusetts Amherst. William was a member of the Reserve Officers' Training Corps (ROTC) as an undergraduate student at Massachusetts Agriculture College, and he was commissioned as a 2nd Lieutenant in the U.S. Army 3rd Cavalry Division, Reserves at graduation.

William N. Sullivan never married and had no children.

== Career ==
The majority of Sullivan's career was with the United States Department of Agriculture (May 18, 1931 - May 5, 1942, and July 21, 1947 - June 30, 1978). He served in the United States Army Air Force during and after World War II (May 5, 1942 - July 21, 1947), entering as a commissioned 1st Lieutenant and rising to Major before being honorably discharged.

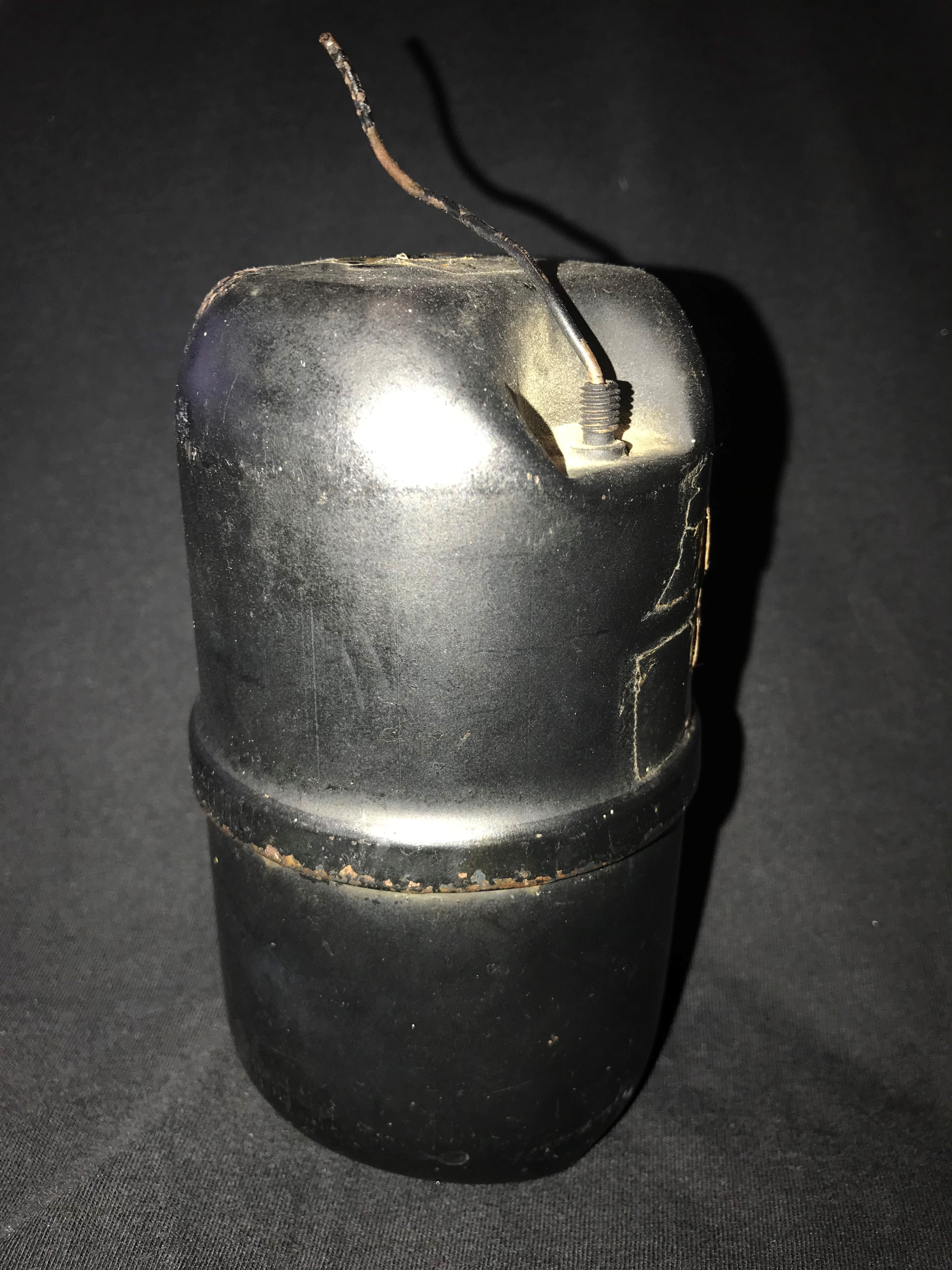
World War II Aerosol Bomb (Bug Bomb)

In the late 1930s, the first of Sullivan's scientific innovations occurred as a result of his interest in the emergence of global air transportation and the possible damage that aircraft travel could do by spreading insects dangerous to humans, crops, and animals. At that time, a crude hand sprayer was used to disperse a solution of pyrethrum in kerosene with the hope of killing some of the insect hitchhikers. Sullivan joined with Dr. Lyle D. Goodhue, an accomplished chemist, to develop improved methods for disinfecting aircraft. Theirs first effort involved burning a mixture of pyrethrum, corn stalks, and sodium nitrate in the presence of house flies. The kill was satisfactory, but too much of the insecticide was destroyed by burning. Dripping the solution on the heated surface of a hotplate gave better results, and splashing was overcome by spraying the solution on a hotplate. The heat produced a fine mist or aerosol that was 20 times more effective against house flies than the original burning method. This principle was widely used in "fogging machines" to control mosquitoes in urban areas, but it was not a practical way for disinfecting aircraft.

Goodhue and Sullivan subsequently experimented with a mixture of pyrethrum, sesame oil, and Freon 12 (Dichlorodifluoromethane) placed in a 5 lb. carbon dioxide cylinder equipped with a valve and an oil burner nozzle. When the tank was inverted and the valve opened, the solution was sprayed out under the vapor pressure of Freon 12, which is 82 lbs./sq. in. at 20 deg. C. The Freon immediately evaporated and left the insecticide dispersed in the air as an aerosol. Goodhue and Sullivan now had a method of dispersing insecticides that was simple, highly effective against mosquitoes, nonflammable, and nonstaining; exactly the qualities that they were seeking in aircraft disinsection. The U.S. Patent Office subsequently granted Goodhue and Sullivan a patent (#2,321,023) on this invention which was assigned to the Secretary of Agriculture.

The breadboard model, as the original patented aerosol was referred to, was excellent for demonstrations, but unsuitable for use in the field. In the jungles of the South Pacific, malaria alone incapacitated eight times as many troops as combat. Sullivan was commissioned into the U.S. Army Air Force and assigned to the Army Medical Center, Walter Reed Hospital. The commanding officer there was familiar with the aerosol development, and secured his transfer to the Aero-Medical Laboratory, Wright-Patterson Air Force Base to develop a suitable insecticidal aerosol container for use by troops in the field. At Wright Field, a representative of Westinghouse Electric Co. and Lt. Sullivan evolved the idea of modifying the 1-lb Freon container used for home refrigerators for use as the aerosol dispenser. The prototype was promising, but the rubber stopper that was used to seal the container between uses was found to leak. This difficulty was overcome by using a metal screw cap, and the World War II "aerosol bomb" was born. Within three months of Sullivan's arrival at Wright Field, the first order of 150,000 aerosol bombs went out. With this order began the manufacture of over 40 million aerosol bombs during World War II for military use.

Sullivan was attached to the Air Transport Command, after three months at Wright Field, and assigned to train personnel in the use of the newly developed aerosol insecticide at U.S. air bases serving the North Africa and India theaters,. During the tour of duty, he traveled throughout British West Africa, North Africa and Karachi, India (now part of Pakistan), in charge of disinsection of U.S. planes to prevent their carrying the malaria-bearing anopheles Gambia mosquito and other insects to South American air bases. After 18 months of service overseas, he was transferred to the Army Air Force Center at Orlando, FL, to develop methods of controlling mosquitoes in jungle areas by airplane spraying. In July 1946 he served as a radiological monitor on atomic bomb tests at the Southwest Pacific atoll of Bikini. Released to inactive duty as a Major in the U.S. Army Air Force in August 1947, he returned to the U.S. Department of Agriculture and the Bureau of Entomology and Plant Quarantine where he spent the remainder of his career, continuing to specialize in aircraft disinsection.

== Awards and honors ==
- The degree of Doctor of Science (honoris causa) from Chicago State University, Chicago, IL in 1976,
- The degree of Doctor of Philosophy (agricultural chemistry), from Tokyo University of Agriculture, Tokyo, Japan, in 1977
- The John Scott Award from the City of Philadelphia
- The Achievement Award from the Chemical Specialties Manufacturers Association
- The Superior Service Unit Award from the U.S. Department of Agriculture
- The First Erik Andreas Rotheim Gold Medal awarded by the Federation of European Aerosol Associations, Oslo, Norway
