= Lyle Goodhue =

American inventor (1903–1981)

Lyle D. Goodhue
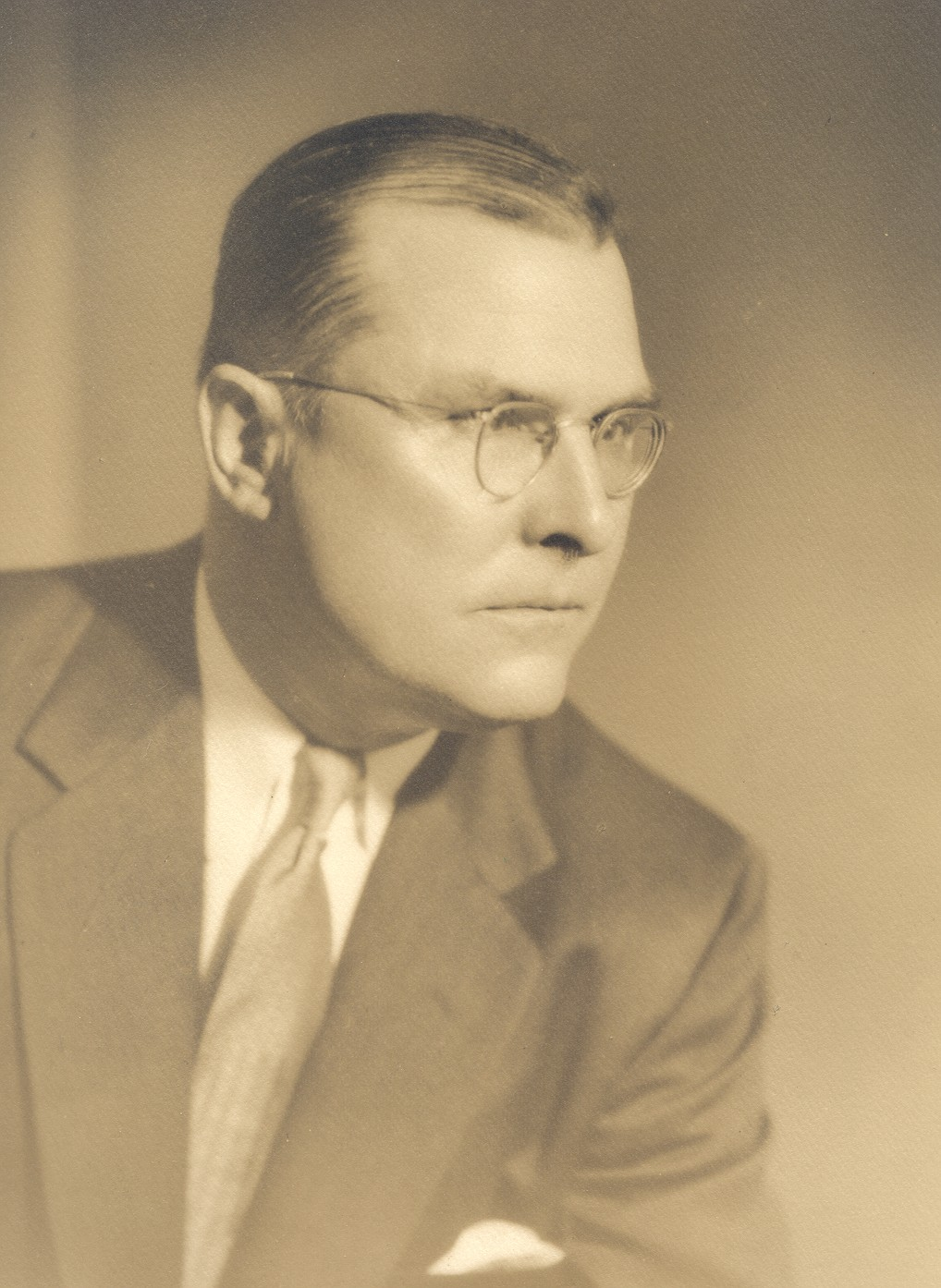
- Born: September 30, 1903; Jasper County, Iowa, US
- Died: September 18, 1981 (aged 77); Bartlesville, Oklahoma, US
- Occupations: Research chemist and entomologist
- Known for: Aerosol “Bug Bomb” and Avitrol bird repellant

Lyle D. Goodhue (September 30, 1903 – September 18, 1981) was an internationally known inventor, research chemist and entomologist, with 105 U. S. and 25 foreign patents. He invented the "aerosol bomb" (also known as the "bug bomb"), which was credited with saving the lives of many thousands of soldiers during World War II by dispensing malaria mosquito-killing liquid insecticides as a mist from small containers. The Bug Bomb became especially important to the war effort after the Philippines fell in 1942, when it was reported that malaria had played a major part in the defeat of American and British forces. After the war, this invention gave birth to a new international billion-dollar aerosol industry. A broad variety of consumer products ranging from cleaners and paints to hair spray and food have since been packaged in aerosol containers. Goodhue's other patents involved insect, bird and animal repellents; herbicides; nematicides; insecticides and other pesticides.

== Education and personal life ==
Goodhue was born on a farm in Malaka Township, Jasper County, Iowa, on September 30, 1903, to Thomas Warwick and Katherine Jane (Engle) Goodhue. Due to his poor eyesight, he was not allowed to enter first grade in Malaka's one-room school house until he was nine years old. After retiring, he acknowledged that he was legally blind,

In 1924, Goodhue graduated from Newton High School in Newton, Iowa. He went on to earn a B.S. (chemistry) in 1928, an M.S. (plant chemistry) in 1929 and a Ph.D. (plant chemistry) in 1934 from Iowa State University, Ames, Iowa.

He married Helen Elizabeth Hamaker, daughter of Charles Haynes and Jenny Leuna (Davis) Hamaker, on June 19, 1929, in Des Moines, Iowa. Their first daughter and son were born in Ames, while Goodhue was studying for his Ph.D. Goodhue worked at the U.S. Department of Agriculture's (USDA) Japanese Beetle Laboratory in Moorestown, New Jersey, when his second son was born, and had transferred to the USDA's Agricultural Research Centre in Beltsville, Maryland when his second daughter was born.

Goodhue died September 18, 1981, in Bartlesville, Oklahoma.

== Career ==
The disposable spray can was largely undeveloped until Lyle Goodhue devised a practical version and filed for a patent in 1941 while working for the USDA.

Goodhue's earliest aerosol propellant idea came to mind when he worked in 1929 and 1930 as a research chemist on lacquer formulations at the DuPont Chemical laboratories in Parlin, New Jersey. That aerosol spray concept was greatly expanded, written in his lab notebook, and witnessed by his boss, Dr. Frank L. Campbell, October 5, 1935, when both worked at the Agricultural Research Center in Beltsville.

As a result of their research, which began January 1941 at USDA, Goodhue, then of Berwyn, Maryland, and William N. Sullivan, of Washington, D.C., received a patent in 1943 for an aerosol "dispensing apparatus". This was the first commercially feasible application which allowed a fine spray to escape through a nozzle mounted on a small container.. Using liquified gas as a propellant, the one-pound portable cylinder allowed U.S. soldiers to effectively repel tropical malaria-carrying insects by spraying non-toxic insecticides inside tents and troop planes during World War II. From 1942 through 1945, more than 40 million "aerosol bombs" were sent to the troops.

In 1945, Goodhue, often called the "Father of the Aerosol Industry", joined Airosol, Inc., in Neodesha, Kansas, as director of research. This company, which had been originally established to manufacture aerosol containers of insecticide for the military during World War II, became a leading packager of aerosol spray consumer products after the war.

In 1947, Goodhue joined Phillips Petroleum Company, Bartlesville, Oklahoma, as a senior research chemist and director of agricultural chemicals research. Of the 98 patents which he received at Phillips, he felt that his most important discovery was Avitrol a treatment which controls and disperses bird infestations through behavioral responses. He retired from Phillips in 1968 as Avitrol technical manager.

== Aerosol development ==
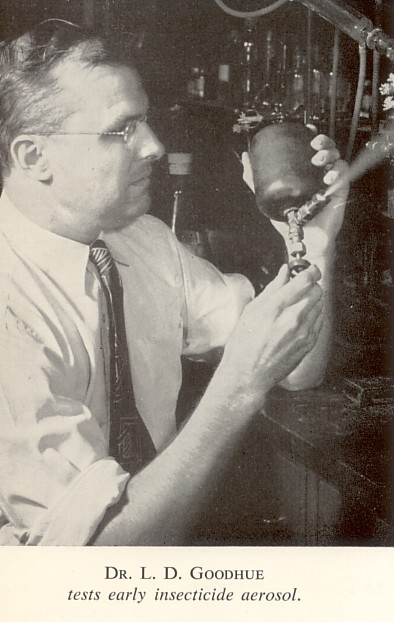

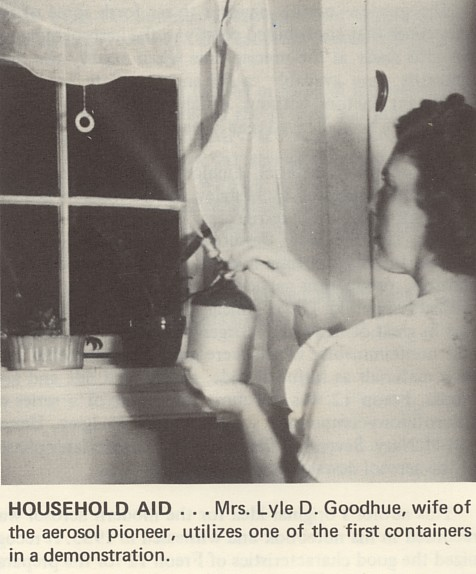

Goodhue wrote this account in 1969 of his ground-breaking 1941 aerosol experiment while working for the USDA in Maryland:

There came a time when the director of research of our bureau began to doubt the value of aerosol research. The Friday before Easter of 1941, the team of Goodhue and Sullivan received a summons to appear at a meeting in his office the following Monday to decide whether our project should be continued. This triggered the first modern aerosol. I said to Bill Sullivan, ‘We better drag out that old idea of mine and, if possible, test it before the meeting with the chiefs on Monday.’ We had been contemplating such a test for some time so part of the materials were on hand. However, I had to purchase the Freon 12 on Saturday and make up the first aerosol on Sunday in my chemical laboratory in Beltsville. I made one successful test with this synergized pyrethrum aerosol in the morning on American roaches left from earlier tests. In the afternoon, friends and families of Goodhue, Sullivan and J. H. Fales gathered at the Entomology laboratory to further test this new method on flies and roaches. The results of all these tests were excellent.

We were ready for the Monday meeting. Goodhue and Sullivan took this rather crude fivepound capacity aerosol container with them to the expected meeting in Washington. We first demonstrated it to the research director. He was not impressed and left the room. Next Sullivan’s chief, Lon Hawkins, saw a demonstration and was very happy to see that the method would work.

After a few more demonstrations for the chiefs of the various divisions, the proposed meeting on aerosols did not materialize, so we took the gadget back to Beltsville and concentrated our efforts on its further development.

In a 1967 newspaper interview, Goodhue had previously revealed a few more dramatic details of his discovery. Wayne Mason, a reporter for the Tulsa World, wrote, “It was on Easter Sunday in 1941 when the great moment came in Goodhue’s life. He had just sprayed a few dozen American roaches with the new aerosol. In his words, “In less than 10 minutes all were on their backs. No one else was in the building. I yelled at the top of my voice and danced around wildly. As soon as I could regain my composure, I drove home like a mad man and called Bill Sullivan and John Fales, and with great enthusiasm gave them the results of the first test.”

== Honors and awards ==
- He was also a member of the professional chemical fraternity of Alpha Chi Sigma, the American Chemical Society, and the Entomological Society of America.
- Goodhue received a number of citations from the U.S. Army and U. S. Navy during and after World War II. He authored over 100 technical papers and scientific articles.
- 1938 Gold Medal, Eastern Branch of the American Association of Economic Entomologists, for his paper entitled the “Effect of Particle Size of Some Insecticides on Their Toxicity to the Codling of Moth Lava”
- 1943 Speaker, New York Herald Tribune Forum, Waldorf-Astoria, New York, New York
- 1945 John Scott Award, Philadelphia, Pennsylvania, for the invention of insecticidal aerosols
- 1948 Alumni Merit Award, Iowa State Alumni Association, Iowa State University, Ames, Iowa
- 1954 Achievement Award, Chemical Specialties Manufacturers Association (CSMA), for work during World War II in developing aerosol insecticides to combat disease-carrying pests
- 1966 Lyle D. Goodhue Research Building, dedicated in honor of his contributions to the aerosol industry, Aerosol Techniques, Inc., Milford, Connecticut
- 1970 Kenneth A. Spencer Award, American Chemical Society, Kansas City section, for outstanding achievement in agricultural and food chemistry
- 1970 Erik Andreas Rotheim Gold Medal, for outstanding contributions to the development of the international aerosol industry, Oslo, Norway
- 2016 Hall of Fame, Newton (Iowa) Community Schools, in recognition of exemplary dedication and accomplishments in science
