= Aerosol spray dispenser =

Dispensing system of an aerosol mist

Aerosol spray is a type of dispensing system which creates an aerosol mist of liquid particles. It comprises a can or bottle that contains a payload, and a propellant under pressure. When the container's valve is opened, the payload is forced out of a small opening and emerges as an aerosol or mist.

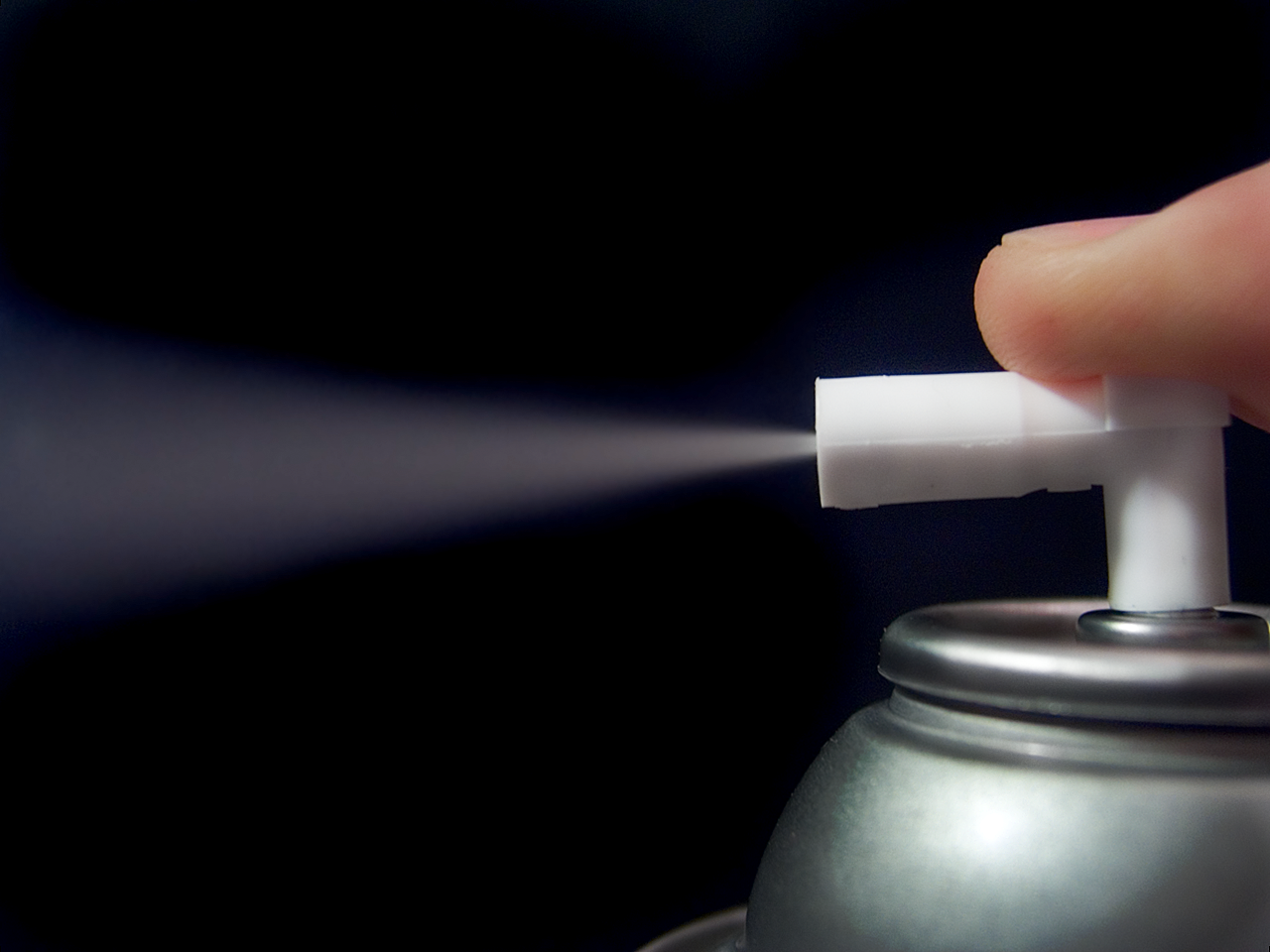
Aerosol spray can

== History ==
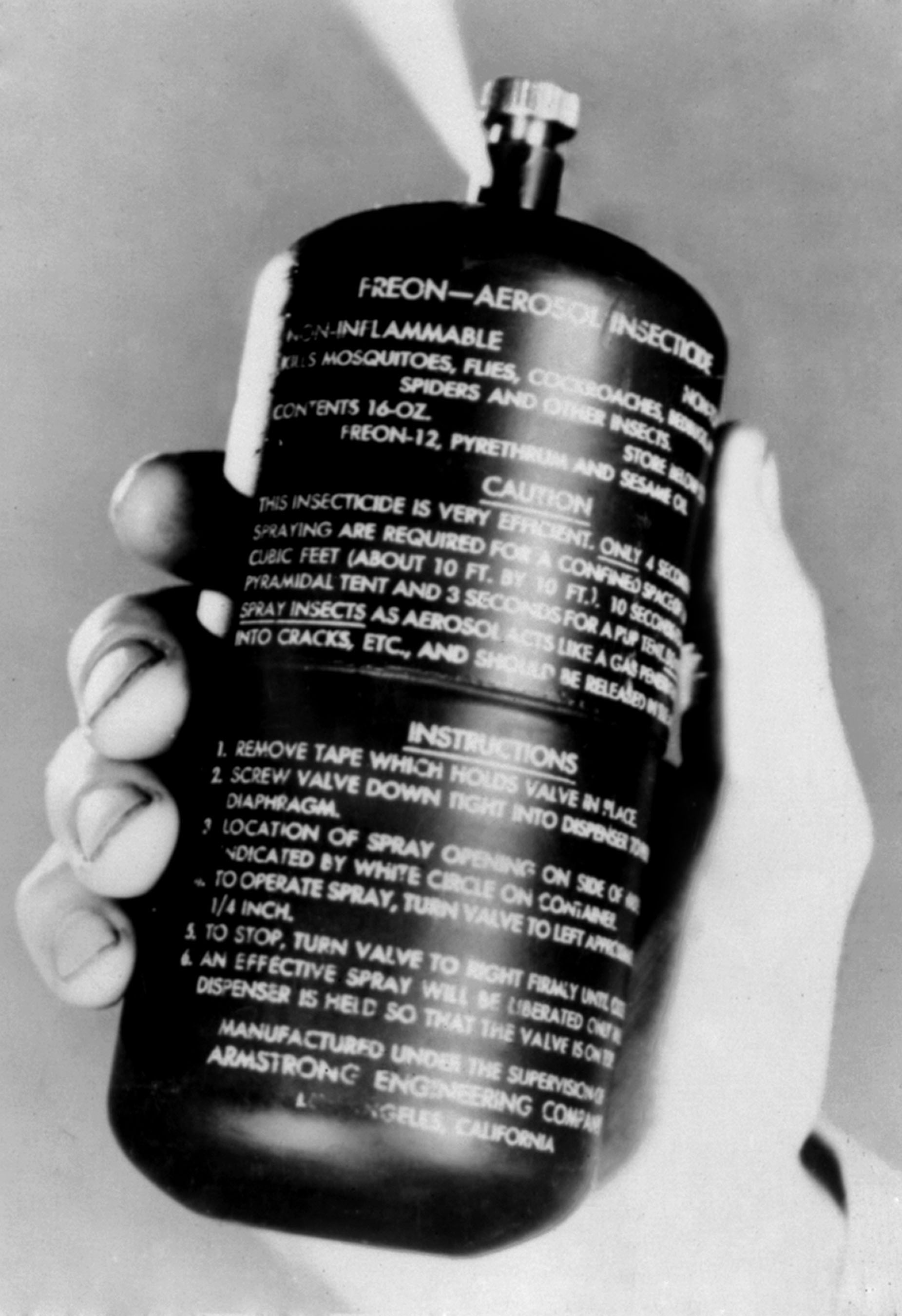
The aerosol spray canister invented by USDA researchers, Lyle Goodhue and William Sullivan

There is a high chance that the concepts of aerosol go as far back as 1790. The first aerosol spray can patent was granted in Oslo in 1927 to Erik Rotheim, a Norwegian chemical engineer, and a United States patent was granted for the invention in 1931. The patent rights were sold to a United States company for 100,000 Norwegian kroner. The Norwegian Postal Service, Posten Norge, celebrated the invention by issuing a stamp in 1998.

In 1939, American Julian S. Kahn received a patent for a disposable spray can, but the product remained largely undeveloped. Kahn's idea was to mix cream and a propellant from two sources to make whipped cream at home—not a true aerosol in that sense. Moreover, in 1949, he disclaimed his first four claims, which were the foundation of his following patent claims.

It was not until 1941 that the aerosol spray can was first put to effective use by Americans Lyle Goodhue and William Sullivan of the United States Bureau of Entomology and Plant Quarantine, who are credited as the inventors of the modern spray can. Their design of a refillable spray can, dubbed the aerosol bomb or bug bomb, is the ancestor of many commercial spray products. It was a hand-sized steel can charged with a liquefied gas under 75 pounds of pressure and a product to be expelled as a mist or a foam. A public-service patent was issued on the invention and assigned to the Secretary of Agriculture for the free use of the people of the United States. Pressurized by liquefied gas, which gave it propellant qualities, the small, portable can enabled soldiers to defend themselves against malaria-carrying mosquitoes by spraying inside tents and airplanes in the Pacific during World War II. Goodhue and Sullivan received the first Erik Rotheim Gold Medal from the Federation of European Aerosol Associations on August 28, 1970, in Oslo, Norway in recognition of their early patents and subsequent pioneering work with aerosol sprays.

In 1948, three companies were granted licenses by the United States government to manufacture aerosol sprays. Two of the three companies, Chase Products Company and Claire Manufacturing, continue to manufacture aerosol sprays. The "crimp-on valve", used to control the spray in low-pressure aerosol sprays was developed in 1949 by Bronx machine shop proprietor Robert H. Abplanalp.

In 1974, Drs. Frank Sherwood Rowland and Mario J. Molina proposed that chlorofluorocarbons, used as propellants in aerosol sprays, contributed to the depletion of Earth's ozone layer. In response to this theory, the U.S. Congress passed amendments to the Clean Air Act in 1977 authorizing the Environmental Protection Agency to regulate the presence of CFCs in the atmosphere. The United Nations Environment Programme called for ozone layer research that same year, and, in 1981, authorized a global framework convention on ozone layer protection. In 1985, Joe Farman, Brian G. Gardiner, and Jon Shanklin published the first scientific paper detailing the hole in the ozone layer. That same year, the Vienna Convention was signed in response to the UN's authorization. Two years later, the Montreal Protocol, which regulated the production of CFCs was formally signed. It came into effect in 1989. The U.S. formally phased out CFCs in 1995.

== Aerosol propellants ==
If aerosol cans were simply filled with compressed gas, it would either need to be at a dangerously high pressure and require special pressure vessel design (like in gas cylinders), or the amount of payload in the can would be small, and rapidly deplete. Usually, the gas is the vapor of a liquid with boiling point slightly lower than room temperature. This means that inside the pressurized can, the vapor can exist in equilibrium with its bulk liquid at a pressure that is higher than atmospheric pressure (and able to expel the payload), but not dangerously high. As gas escapes, it is immediately replaced by evaporating liquid. Since the propellant exists in liquid form in the can, it should be miscible with the payload or dissolved in the payload. In gas dusters and freeze sprays, the payload itself acts as the propellant. The propellant in a gas duster can is not "compressed air" as sometimes assumed, but usually a haloalkane.

Chlorofluorocarbons (CFCs) were once often used as propellants, but since the Montreal Protocol came into force in 1989, they have been replaced in nearly every country due to the negative effects CFCs have on Earth's ozone layer. The most common replacements of CFCs are mixtures of volatile hydrocarbons, typically propane, n-butane and isobutane. Dimethyl ether (DME) and methyl ethyl ether are also used. All these have the disadvantage of being flammable. Nitrous oxide and carbon dioxide are also used as propellants to deliver foodstuffs (for example, whipped cream and cooking spray). Medicinal aerosols such as asthma inhalers use hydrofluoroalkanes (HFA): either HFA 134a (1,1,1,2,-tetrafluoroethane) or HFA 227 (1,1,1,2,3,3,3-heptafluoropropane) or combinations of the two. More recently, liquid hydrofluoroolefin (HFO) propellants have become more widely adopted in aerosol systems due to their relatively low vapor pressure, low global warming potential (GWP), and nonflammability.

Liquid aerosol propellant filling machines require additional precautions, such as being mounted externally to the production warehouse in a gas house. Liquid aerosol propellant machines are typically constructed to comply with ATEX Zone II/2G regulations (classification Zone 1).

== Packaging ==
A typical paint valve system will have a "female" valve, the stem being part of the top actuator. The valve can be preassembled with the valve cup and installed on the can as one piece, prior to pressure-filling. The actuator is added later.

Modern aerosol spray products have three major parts: the can, the valve and the actuator or button. The can is most commonly lacquered tinplate (steel with a layer of tin) and may be made of two or three pieces of metal crimped together. Aluminium cans are also common and are generally used for products that are more expensive or intended to have a more premium appearance, such as personal care products. The valve is crimped to the inside rim of the can, and the design of this component is important in determining the spray rate. The actuator is depressed by the user to open the valve; a spring closes the valve again when it is released. The shape and size of the nozzle in the actuator controls the aerosolized particle size and the spread of the aerosol spray.

== Non-propellant packaging alternatives ==
True aerosol sprays release their propellant during use. Some non-propellant alternatives include various spray bottles, squeeze bottles, and Bag on Valve (BoV) or Bag in Can (BiC) compressed gas aerosol systems.

Packaging that uses a piston barrier system by CCL Industries or EarthSafe by Crown Holdings is often selected for highly viscous products such as post-foaming hair gels, thick creams and lotions, food spreads and industrial products and sealants. The main benefit of this system is that it eliminates gas permeation and assures separation of the product from the propellant, maintaining the purity and integrity of the formulation throughout its consumer lifespan. The piston barrier system also provides a consistent flow rate with minimal product retention.

Another type of dispensing system is the bag-in-can (or BOV, bag-on-valve technology) system where the product is separated from the pressurizing agent with a hermetically sealed, multi-layered laminated pouch, which maintains complete formulation integrity so only pure product is dispensed. Among its many benefits, the bag-in-can system extends a product's shelf life, is suitable for all-attitude, (360-degree) dispensing, quiet and non-chilling discharge. One key performance difference relative to true aerosol systems is that traditional BoV dispensing pressures, BoVs pressurized solely by pressurized gas) drops as the product is dispensed. This bag-in-can system is used in the packaging of pharmaceutical, industrial, household, pet care and other products that require complete separation between the product and the propellant or require near complete evacuation of thin to viscous formulations.

A later development is the 2K (two component) aerosol spray, with a main component stored in a main chamber, and a second component stored in an accessory container. When an applicator activates the 2K aerosol by breaking the accessory container, the two components mix. The 2K aerosol can is advantageous for delivery of reactive mixtures; for example, a 2K reactive mixture can use low molecular weight monomer, oligomer, and functionalized low molecular polymer to make a final cross-linked high molecular weight polymer. A 2K aerosol can increase solid contents and deliver high-performance polymer products, such as curable paints, foams, and adhesives.

== Safety concerns ==
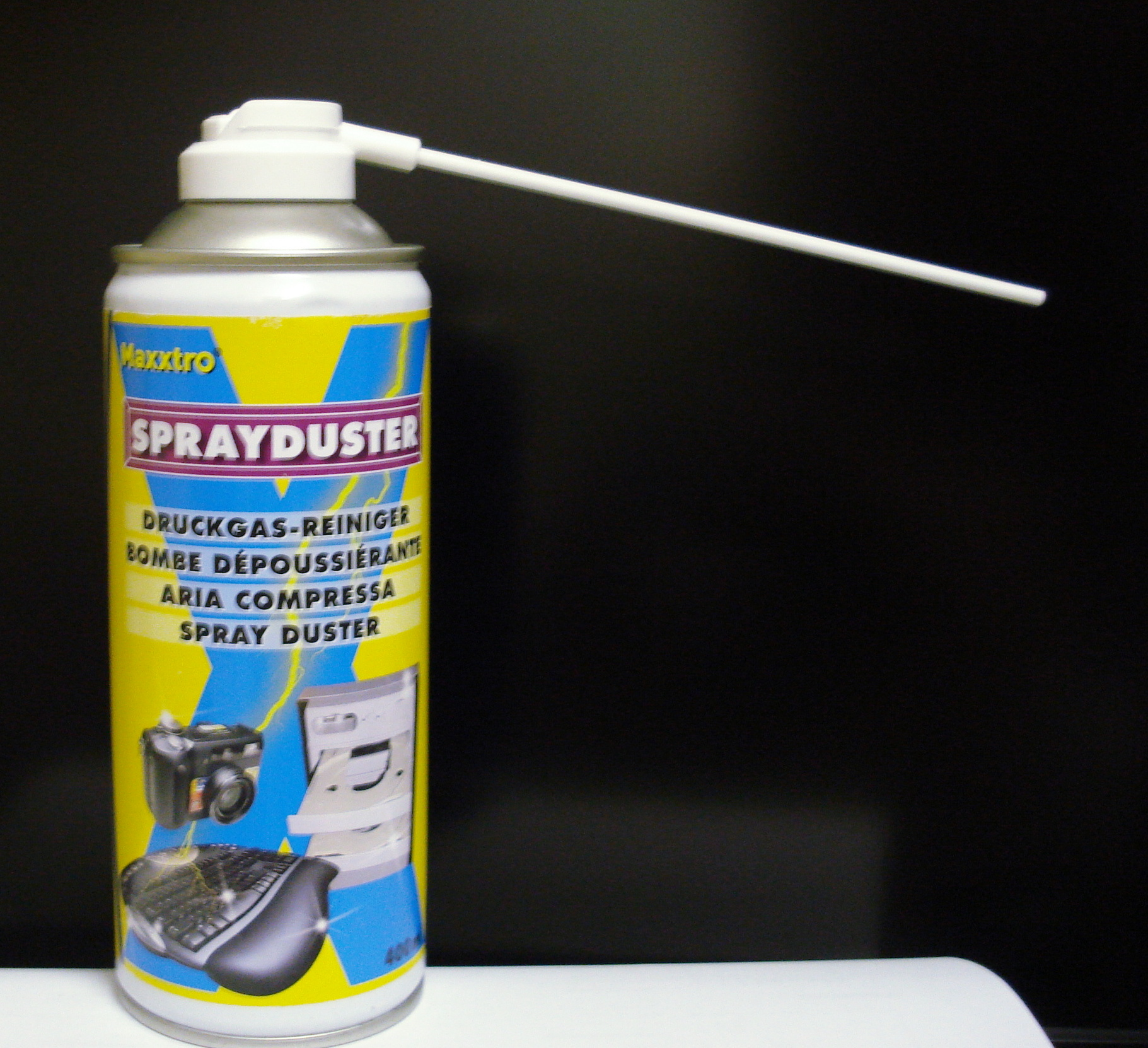
Canned air / dusters do not contain oxygen, and are dangerous, even deadly, to inhale.

Aerosol cans have three main areas of health concern:

- Contents may be deliberately inhaled to achieve intoxication from the propellant (known as inhalant abuse or "huffing"). Calling them "canned air" or "cans of compressed air" could mislead the ignorant to think they are harmless; in fact, such misuse has caused deaths.
- Aerosol burn injuries can be caused by the spraying of aerosol directly onto the skin, in a practice sometimes called "frosting".
- The propellants in aerosol cans are typically combinations of ignitable gases and have been known to cause fires and explosions. However, non-flammable compressed gases such as nitrogen and nitrous oxide have been widely adopted into a number of aerosol systems such as air fresheners and aerosolized whipped cream, as have non-flammable liquid propellants.
- In later 2021 and through 2022, a large number of consumer aerosols were recalled due to the presence of benzene in their finished products. Where the recall was far reaching, Benzene is considered a trace contaminant in some but not all hydrocarbon propellants. Though rigorous testing at both the propellant manufacturer and the aerosol filling site, unsuitable aerosol propellants can be detected and destroyed prior to use in any finished products.

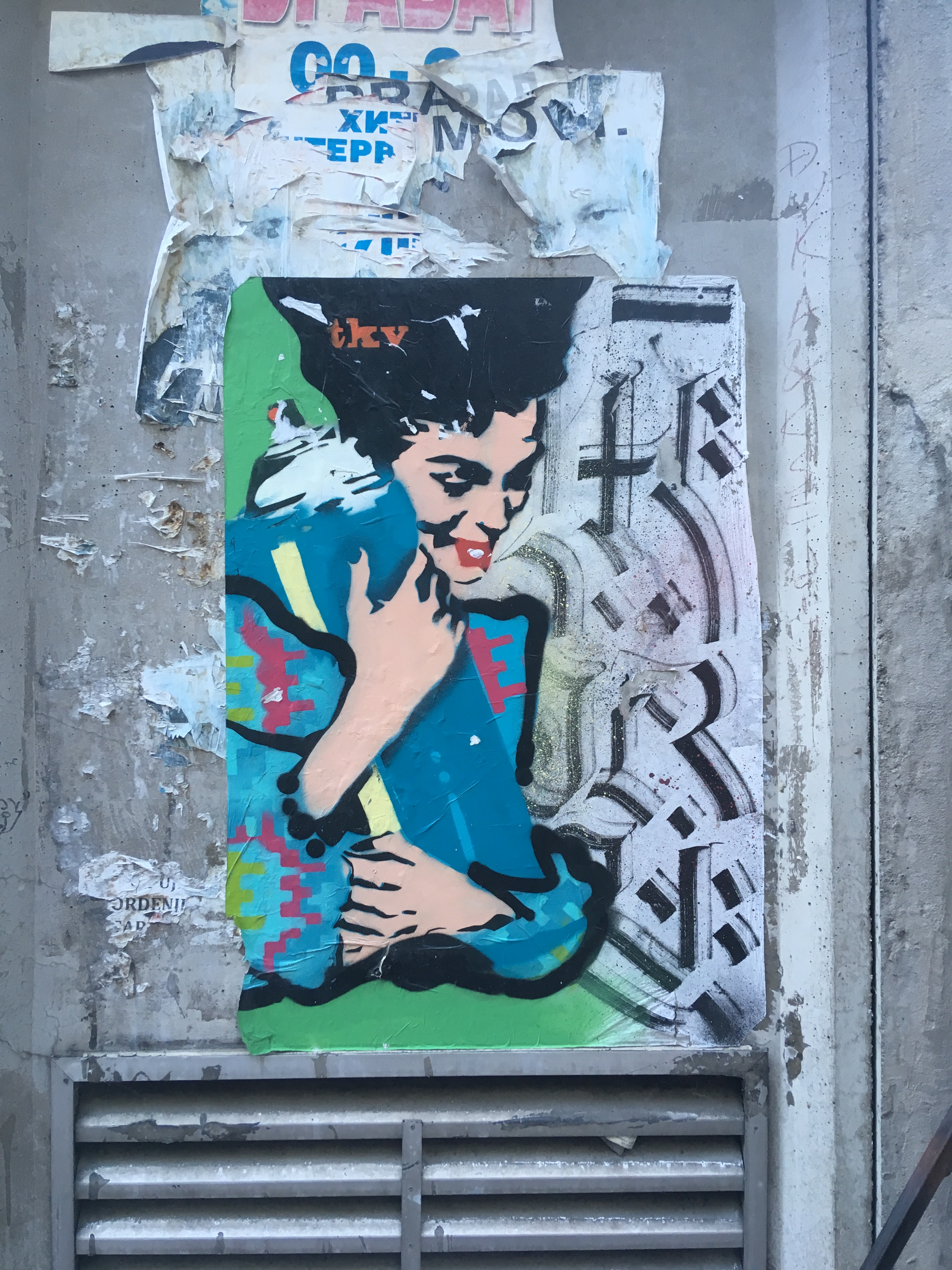
TKV's paste-up depicting a woman hugging a spray can

In the United States, non-empty aerosol cans are considered hazardous waste, but are still considered "recyclable when empty" in some US curbside recycling programs.

Aerosol products in the European Union must comply with health and safety regulations as set out in Directive 75/324/EEC. which established the "reversed epsilon" mark. (Note: U+025C ɜ LATIN SMALL LETTER REVERSED OPEN E) This marking is required for aerosol products over 50ml. The same marking is also used in the United Kingdom, although the UKCA marking is planned to replace it in Great Britain.

== See also ==
- Aerosol paint
- Fabrican
- Graffiti
- Silly String
- Spray nozzle
