= Aircraft disinsection =

Use of insecticide on aircraft for insect and disease control

Aircraft disinsection is the use of insecticide on international flights and in other closed spaces for insect and disease control. Confusion with disinfection, the elimination of microbes on surfaces, is not uncommon. Insect vectors of disease, mostly mosquitoes, have been introduced into and become indigenous in geographic areas where they were not previously present. Dengue, chikungunya and Zika spread across the Pacific and into the Americas by means of the airline networks. Cases of "airport malaria", in which live malaria-carrying mosquitoes disembark and infect people near the airport, may increase with global warming.

Definitions in the International Health Regulations (IHR) of the World Health Organization are:

- "Disinfection" means the procedure whereby health measures are taken to control or kill infectious agents on a human or animal body surface or in or on baggage, cargo, containers, conveyances, goods and postal parcels by direct exposure to chemical or physical agents.
- "Disinsection" means the procedure whereby health measures are taken to control or kill the insect vectors of human diseases present in baggage, cargo, containers, conveyances, goods and postal parcels.

Disinsection is mandated by the IHR. The WHO recommends d-phenothrin (2%) for space spraying and permethrin (2%) for residual disinsection. Neither is harmful when used as recommended, according to WHO. Disinsection is one of two applications of the IHR likely to be encountered by travelers; yellow fever vaccination is the other.

== Mosquitos ==
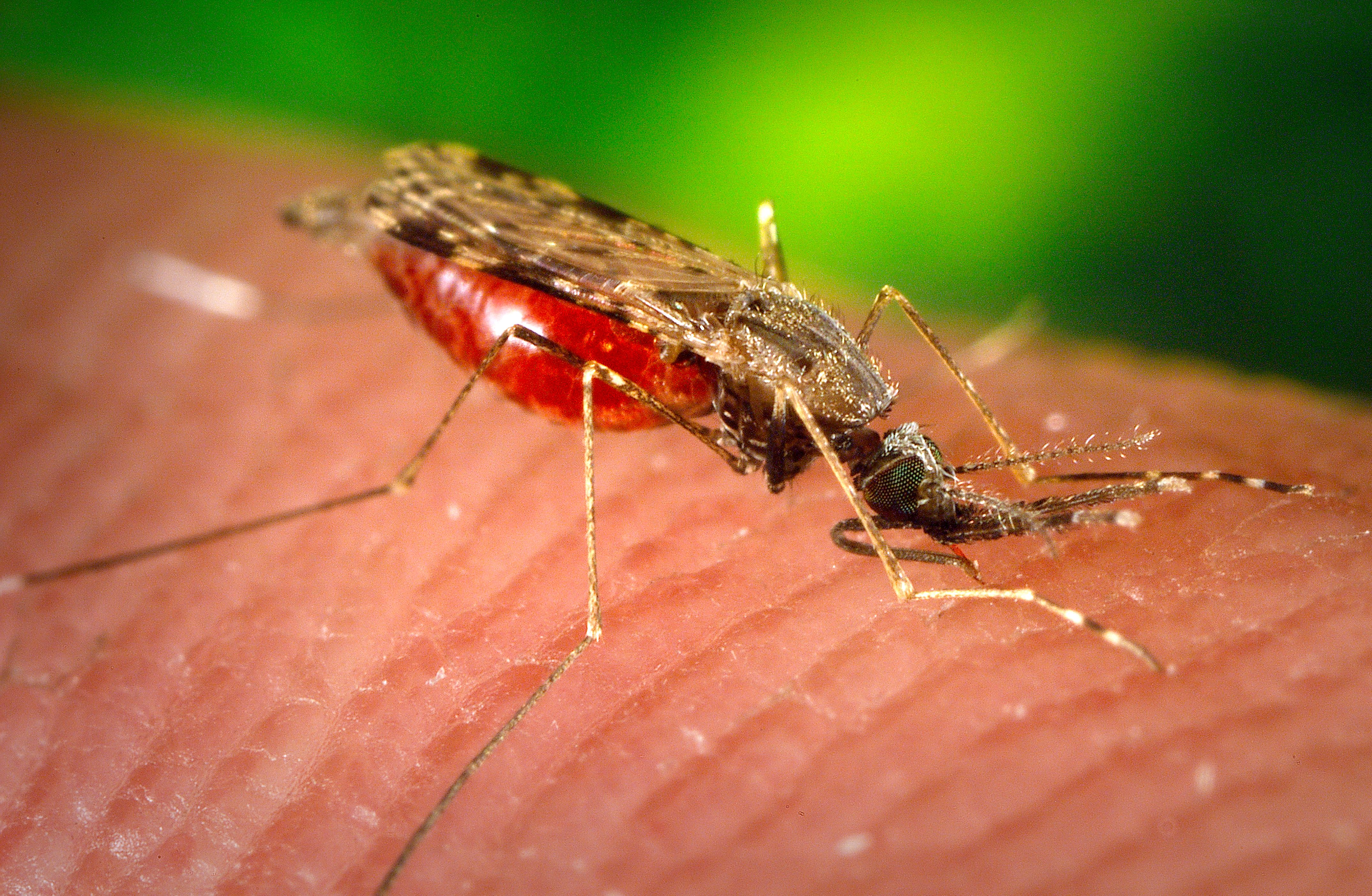
An image of a mosquito on human skin.

Mosquitos are primary concern with regards to aircraft disinsection. Mosquitos can transmit vector-borne diseases including "... malaria, dengue, West Nile virus, chikungunya, yellow fever and Zika." The nature of these parasites and viruses enables them to be transmitted through the trace amounts of saliva from mosquitos when they bite. The mixture of the saliva with each bite carries the disease into the skin and bloodstream of a human, rapidly transmitting the parasites and viruses.

In many cases, these diseases are concentrated in certain countries, as listed below. This present a hazard to international travel, as the introduction of disease-carrying mosquitos on aircraft can pass a contagious illness across the planet over the course of a few hours.

== D-phenothrin ==
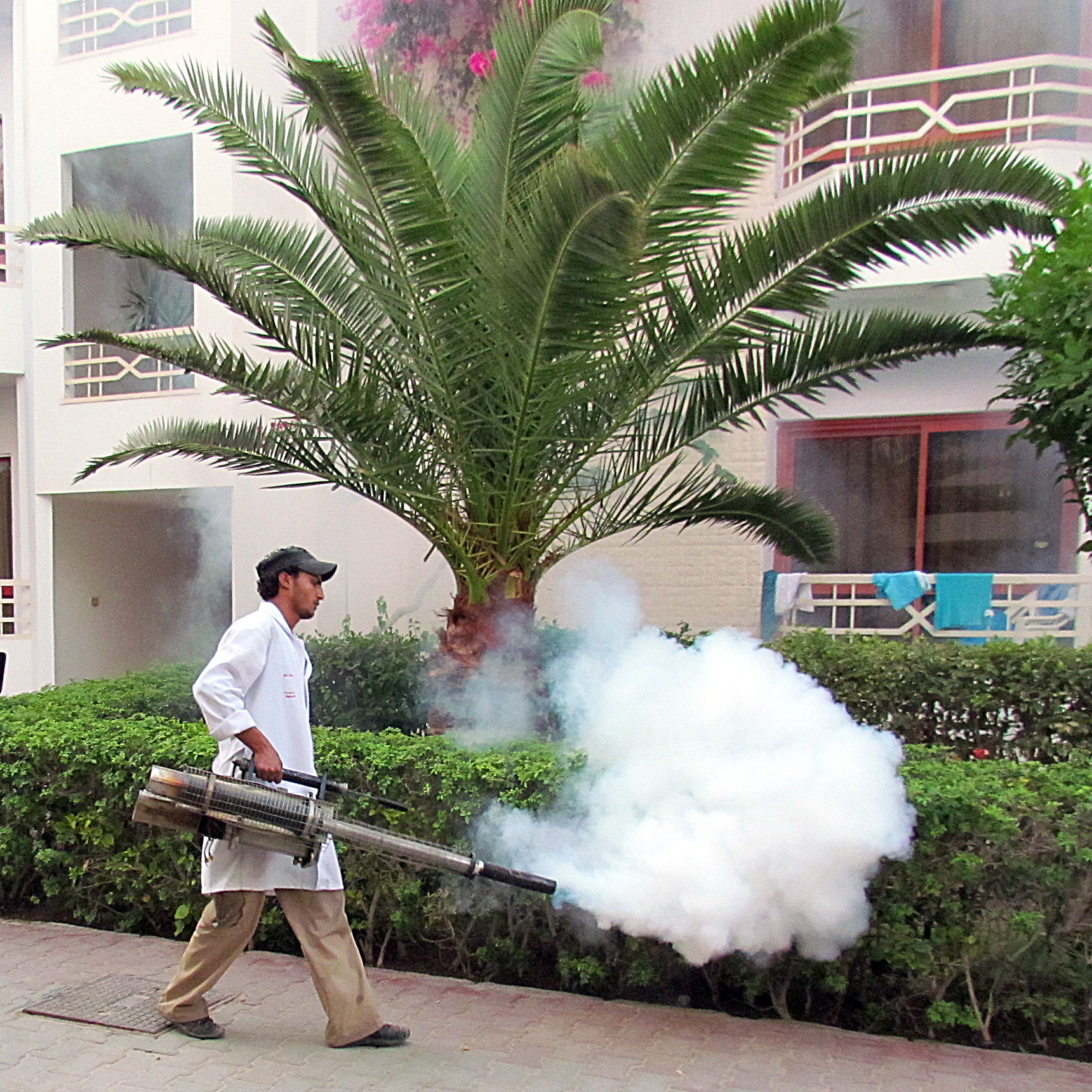
An example of disinsection via space spraying.

D-phenothrin is a synthetic chemical insecticide used against mosquitos. The chemical is a nerve poison to mosquitos that works "...by interfering with a nerve cell's ability to send a normal signal by jamming open tiny gates on the cell.." In aircraft disinsection, the chemical is used is small concentrations throughout the cabin of the aircraft in the air, known as "Space Spraying".

== Permethrin ==
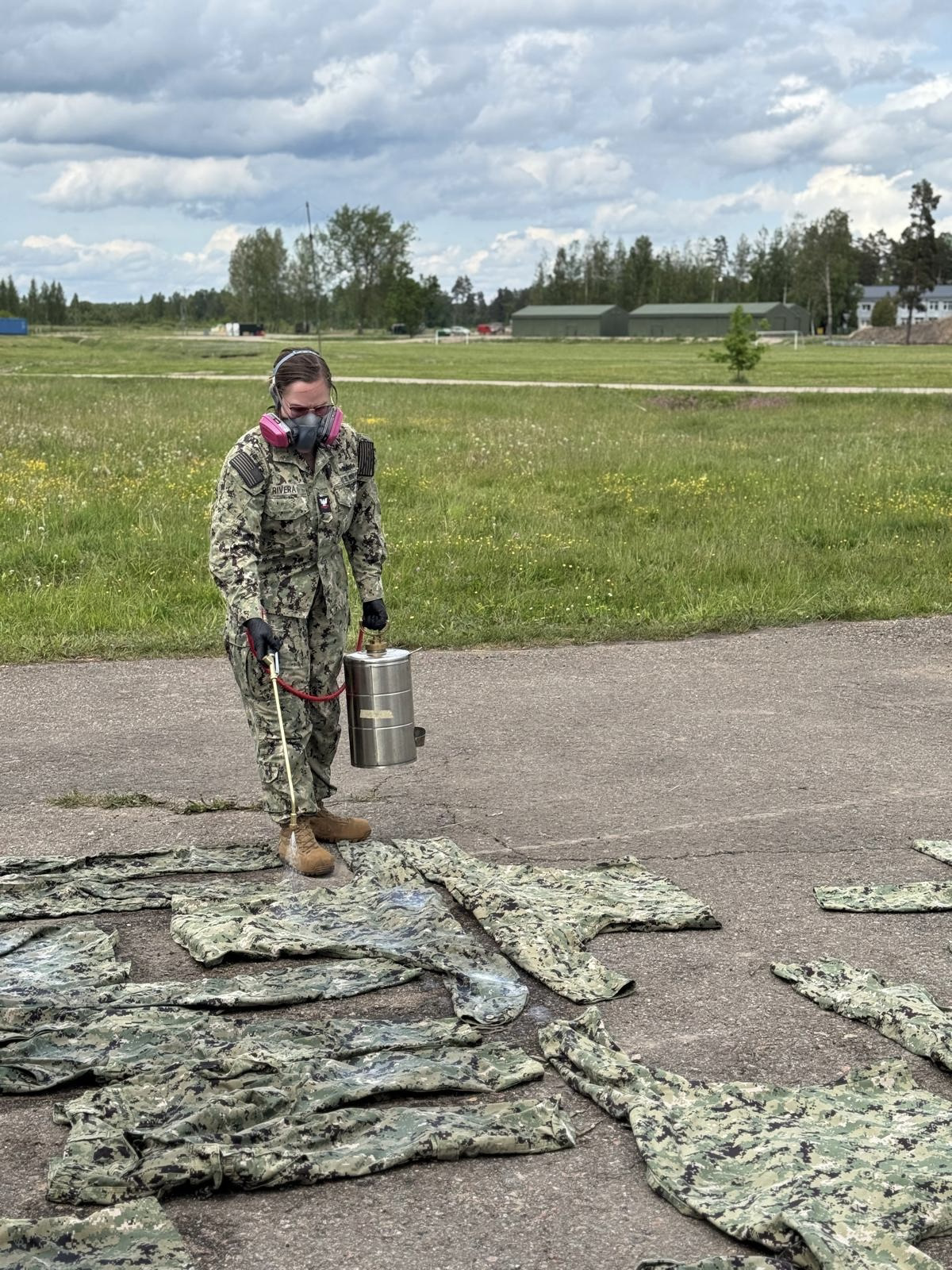
An example of disinsection via direct application

Permethrin is an insecticide used against mosquitos. The chemical targets the nerves of insects to "...causing muscle spasms, paralysis and death." While commonly used against mosquitos, the chemical can also target scabies and head lice of humans. In such cases, the chemical is used in a concentration of approximately 2%. Permethrin is used in a direct application, where the solution is sprayed directly onto surfaces of the aircraft.

== U.S. Requirements ==
=== Department of Transportation (DOT) ===
In the United States, the Department of Transportation (DOT) governs aircraft disinsection. Their policies outline which inbound flights from certain counties must be treated and the method(s) to do so. One method of disinsection the DOT details the use of aerosolized spray in the aircraft while in flight. This method involves the application of an agent throughout the cabin of the aircraft in aerosolized form. This agent mixes with the air in the cabin so that it can freely travel through the aircraft.

The list of flights from inbound countries requiring the use of an aerosolized spray is as follows:

- Ecuador (only Galapagos and Interislands)
- Grenada
- Guyana
- India
- Kiribati
- Madagascar
- Panama
- Seychelles
- Tanzania
- Timor-Leste
- Trinidad and Tobago
- Uruguay
- Zimbabwe

=== Environmental Protection Agency (EPA) ===
The Environmental Protection Agency (EPA) detail requirements for aircraft disinsection based primarily on protection of species and air quality within the United States. More specifically, there guidance refers to a "...country (that) could impose such a requirement should they perceive a threat to their public health, agriculture or environment."

With regards to EPA approval of certain products, the EPA currently does not have any products approved for aircraft disinsection. Their conclusions were as follows "...available data do not demonstrate that the benefits of such use outweigh the potential associated risks and may therefore pose a risk of unreasonable adverse effects to human health and the environment. " To supplement this, the EPA has published guidance in PRN 96-3: Pesticide Products Used to Disinsect Aircraft. This guidance details requirements fore registration of future products as well as safe usage practices.
