= Chlorothalonil =

Fungicide

- Chlorothalonil

Names
- Preferred IUPAC name 2,4,5,6-Tetrachlorobenzene-1,3-dicarbonitrile
- Other names 2,4,5,6-Tetrachloroisophthalonitrile; Bravo; Daconil; Tetrachloroisophthalonitrile; Celeste; Bronco; Agronil; Aminil

Identifiers
CAS Number	1897-45-6
3D model (JSmol)	Interactive image
ChEBI	CHEBI:3639
ChEMBL	ChEMBL468167
ChemSpider	13861400
ECHA InfoCard	100.015.990
EC Number	217-588-1
KEGG	C11037
PubChem CID	15910
RTECS number	NT2600000
UNII	J718M71A7A
UN number	3276, 2588
CompTox Dashboard (EPA)	DTXSID0020319
- InChI: InChI=1S/C8Cl4N2/c9-5-3(1-13)6(10)8(12)7(11)4(5)2-14 Key: CRQQGFGUEAVUIL-UHFFFAOYSA-N
- SMILES: Clc1c(C#N)c(Cl)c(C#N)c(Cl)c1Cl

Properties
Chemical formula	C_{8}Cl_{4}N_{2}
Molar mass	265.90 g·mol^{−1}
Appearance	white crystalline solid
Density	1.8 g cm^{−3}, solid
Melting point	250 °C (482 °F; 523 K)
Boiling point	350 °C (662 °F; 623 K) (760 mmHg)
Solubility in water	10 mg/100 mL
log P	2.88–3.86

Hazards
- GHS labelling
Pictograms	(GHS05: Corrosive) (GHS06: Toxic) (GHS07: Exclamation mark) (GHS08: Health hazard) (GHS09: Environmental hazard)
Signal word	Danger
Hazard statements	H317, H318, H330, H335, H351, H410
Precautionary statements	P201, P202, P260, P271, P272, P273, P280, P281, P284, P302+P352, P304+P340, P305+P351+P338, P308+P313, P310, P312, P320, P321, P333+P313, P363, P391, P403+P233, P405, P501

Related compounds
Related nitriles; organochlorides	benzonitrile; hexachlorobenzene, dichlorobenzene, chlorobenzene
- Except where otherwise noted, data are given for materials in their standard state (at 25 °C [77 °F], 100 kPa). verify (what is ?) Infobox references

Chlorothalonil (2,4,5,6-tetrachloroisophthalonitrile) is an organic compound mainly used as a broad spectrum, nonsystemic fungicide, with other uses as a wood protectant, pesticide, acaricide, and to control mold, mildew, bacteria, algae. Chlorothalonil-containing products are sold under the names Bravo, Echo, and Daconil. It was first registered for use in the US in 1966. In 1997, it was the third most used fungicide in the US, behind only sulfur and copper, with 12 million pounds (5.4 million kilograms) used in agriculture that year. Including nonagricultural uses, the United States Environmental Protection Agency (EPA) estimates, on average, almost 15 million lb (6.8 million kg) were used annually from 1990 to 1996.

== Uses ==
Lower estimate of chlorothalonil use in the US in pounds per square mile in 2017 (USGS data)

In the US, chlorothalonil is used predominantly on peanuts (about 34% of usage), potatoes (about 12%), and tomatoes (about 7%), although the EPA recognizes its use on many other crops. It is also used on golf courses and lawns (about 10%) and as a preservative additive in some paints (about 13%), resins, emulsions, and coatings.

Chlorothalonil is commercially available in many different formulations and delivery methods. It is applied as a dust, dry or water-soluble grains, a wettable powder, a liquid spray, a fog, and a dip. It may be applied by hand, by ground sprayer, or by aircraft.

=== International ===
Chlorothalonil is also registered for use in Uganda.

== Mechanism of action ==
Chlorothalonil reacts with glutathione giving an glutathione adduct with elimination of HCl. Its mechanism of action is similar to that of trichloromethyl sulfenyl fungicides such as captan and folpet.

== Toxicity ==
=== Acute ===
According to the EPS, chlorothalonil is a toxicity category I eye irritant, producing severe eye irritation. It is in toxicity category II, "moderately toxic", if inhaled (inhaled LD_{50} 0.094 mg/L in rats.) For skin contact and ingestion, chlorothalonil is rated toxicity category IV, "practically nontoxic", meaning the oral and dermal LD_{50} is greater than 10,000 mg/kg.

=== Carcinogenic ===
International Agency for Research on Cancer IARC has assessed chlorothalonil as a Group 2B "possible human carcinogen", based on observations of cancers of the renal and gastrointestinal systems in laboratory animals fed diets containing chlorothalonil.

=== Environmental ===
Chlorothalonil was found to be an important factor in the decline of the honey bee population, by making the bees more vulnerable to the fungal pathogen Nosema ceranae.

Chlorothalonil is highly toxic to fish and aquatic invertebrates, but not toxic to birds.

At a concentration of 164 μg/L, chlorothalonil was found to kill a species of frog within a day.

=== Contaminants ===
Common chlorothalonil synthesis procedures frequently result in contamination of it with small amounts of hexachlorobenzene (HCB), which is toxic. US regulations limit HCB in commercial production to 0.05% of chlorothalonil. According to the EPA report, "post-application exposure to HCB from chlorothalonil is not expected to be a concern based on the low level of HCB in chlorothalonil. 2,3,7,8-Tetrachlorodibenzodioxin being one of the most potent carcinogens known is also a known contaminant".

== Environmental contamination ==
Chlorothalonil has been detected in ambient air Prince Edward Island, as well as in groundwater in Long Island, New York and Florida. In the first three cases, the contamination is presumed to have come from potato farms. It has also been detected in several fish kills in Prince Edward Island.

The main breakdown product of chlorothalonil is SDS-3701 (structure shown below). SDS-3701 has been shown to be 30 times more acutely toxic than chlorothalonil and more persistent in the environment. Laboratory experiments have shown it can thin the eggshells of birds, but no evidence supports this happening in the environment.

In 2019, a review of the evidence found that "a high risk to amphibians and fish was identified for all representative uses", and that chlorothalonil breakdown products may cause DNA damage. Agrochemicals are claimed to be the strongest factor in bumblebee population decline.

Important metabolites of chlorothalonil

SDS-3701

R417888

R471811

=== Gag order ===
Syngenta sued to stop communication by Swiss health authorities with the Swiss public regarding the "relevance" of specific metabolites of chlorothalonil that Swiss authorities detected in high concentrations in the groundwater from which hundreds of thousands of Swiss people obtain drinking water. The court banned Swiss health authorities from communicating with the public about the dangers posed by some of the metabolites.

=== Bans ===
In March 2019, as a result of the previously mentioned research, the European Union banned the use of chlorothalonil dated to take effect May 20, 2020. Switzerland followed in December 2019.

== Production ==
Chlorothalonil can be produced by the direct chlorination of isophthalonitrile or by dehydration of tetrachloroisophthaloyl amide with phosphoryl chloride. It is a white solid. It breaks down under basic conditions, but is stable in neutral and acidic media. Technical grade chlorothalonil contains traces of TCDD and hexachlorobenzene, both are persistent organic pollutants banned under the Stockholm Convention.
