= DDT =

Organochloride known as an insecticide

Dichlorodiphenyltrichloroethane
- Chemical structure of DDT

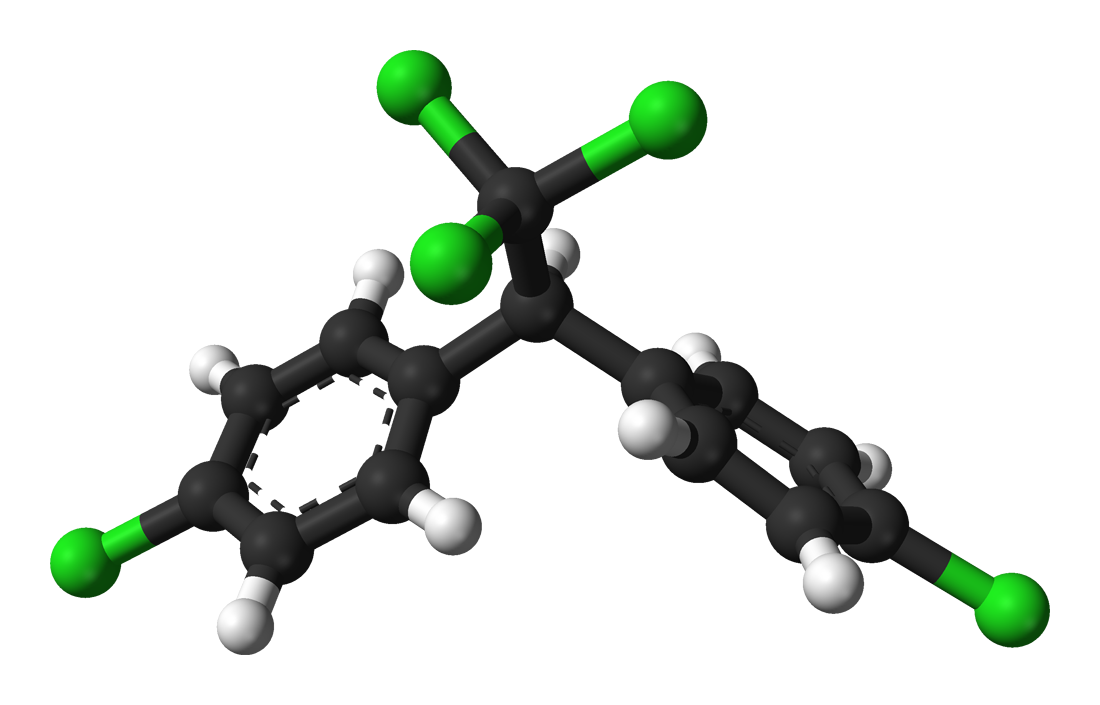

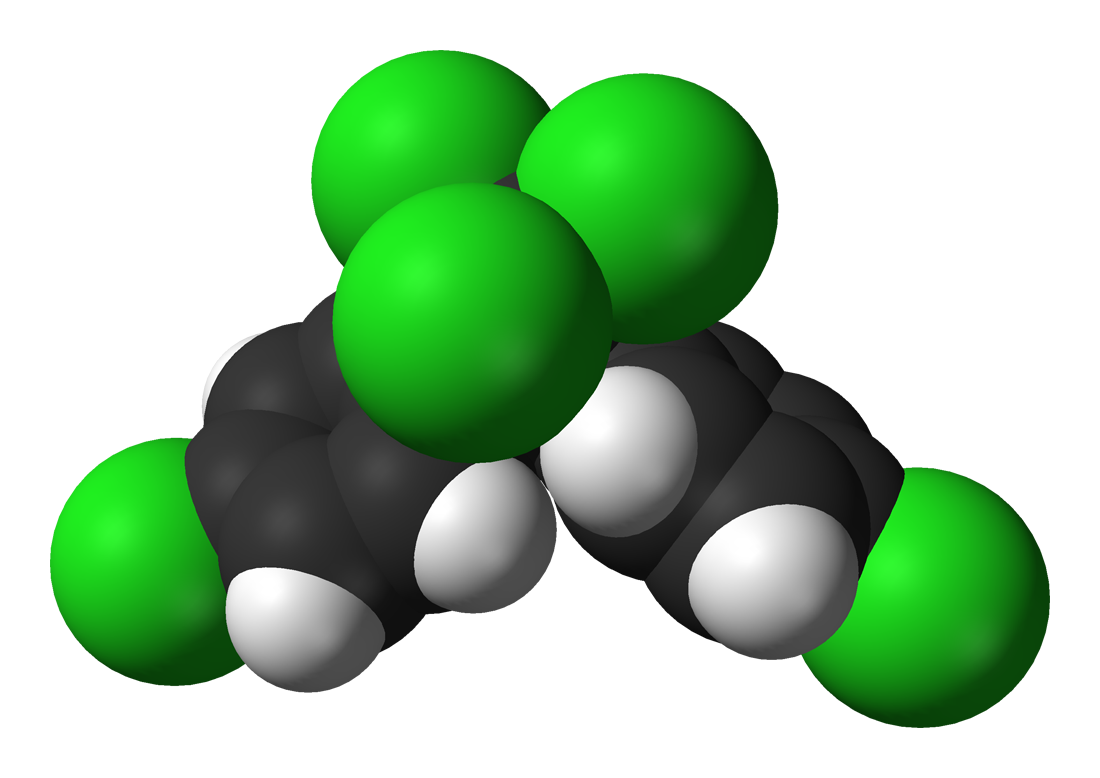

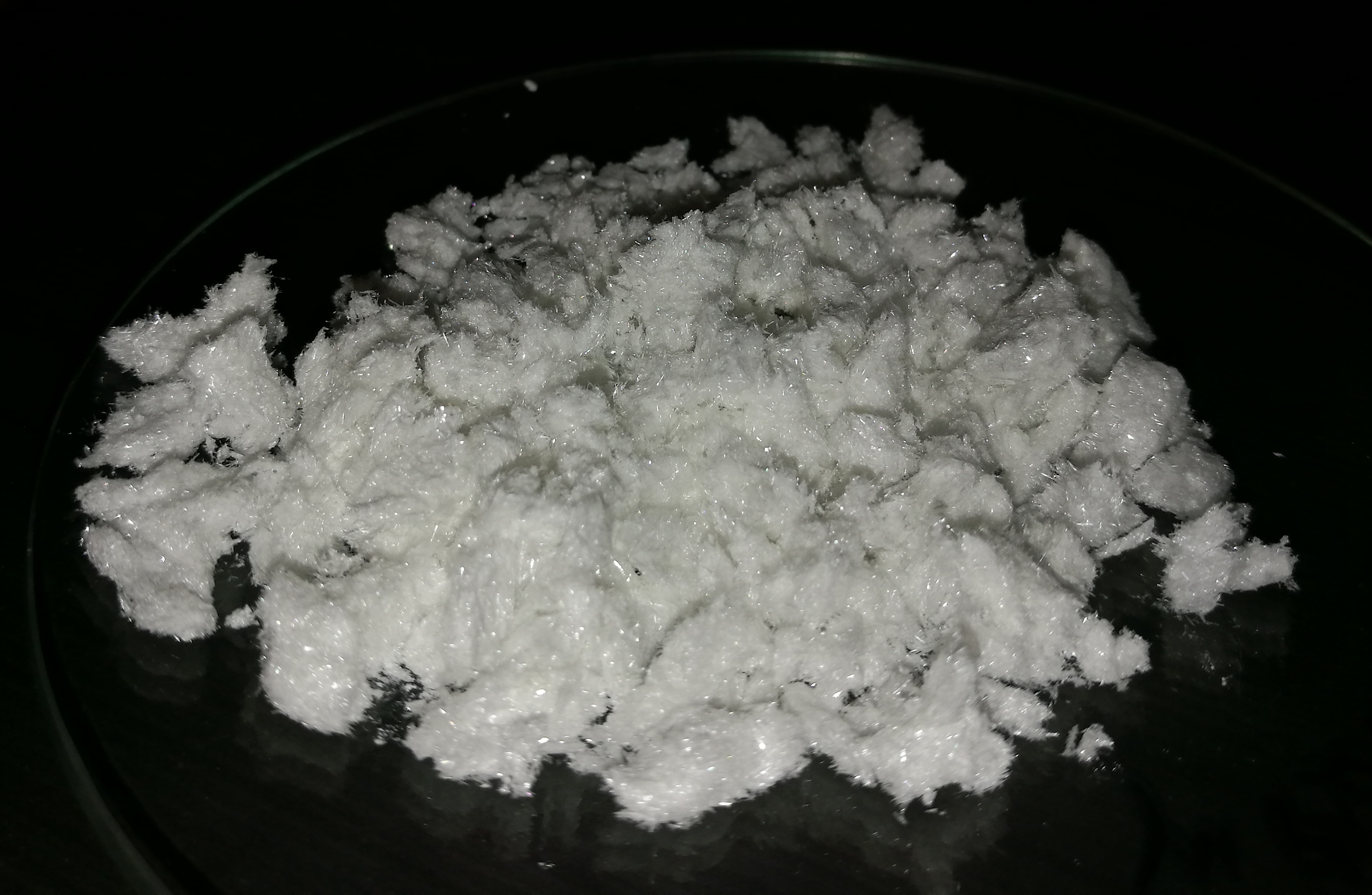

Names
- IUPAC name 1,1,1-Trichloro-bis-2,2(4-chlorophenyl)ethane
- Preferred IUPAC name 1,1′-(2,2,2-Trichloroethane-1,1-diyl)bis(4-chlorobenzene)
- Other names Dichlorodiphenyltrichloroethane (DDT); Clofenotane

Identifiers
CAS Number	50-29-3
3D model (JSmol)	Interactive image
ChEBI	CHEBI:16130
ChEMBL	ChEMBL416898
ChemSpider	2928
ECHA InfoCard	100.000.023
KEGG	D07367
PubChem CID	3036
UNII	CIW5S16655
CompTox Dashboard (EPA)	DTXSID4020375
- InChI: InChI=1S/C14H9Cl5/c15-11-5-1-9(2-6-11)13(14(17,18)19)10-3-7-12(16)8-4-10/h1-8,13H Key: YVGGHNCTFXOJCH-UHFFFAOYSA-N; InChI=1/C14H9Cl5/c15-11-5-1-9(2-6-11)13(14(17,18)19)10-3-7-12(16)8-4-10/h1-8,13H Key: YVGGHNCTFXOJCH-UHFFFAOYAJ
- SMILES: ClC1=CC=C(C(C(Cl)(Cl)Cl)C2=CC=C(C=C2)Cl)C=C1

Properties
Chemical formula	C_{14}H_{9}Cl_{5}
Molar mass	354.48 g·mol^{−1}
Density	0.99 g/cm^{3}
Melting point	108.5 °C (227.3 °F; 381.6 K)
Boiling point	260 °C (500 °F; 533 K) (decomposes)
Solubility in water	25 μg/L (25 °C)

Pharmacology
ATCvet code	QP53AB01 (WHO)

Hazards
- Occupational safety and health (OHS/OSH)
Main hazards	Toxic, dangerous to the environment, suspected carcinogen
- GHS labelling
Pictograms	(GHS06: Toxic) (GHS08: Health hazard) (GHS09: Environmental hazard)
Signal word	Danger
Hazard statements	H301, H351, H372, H410
Precautionary statements	P203, P260, P264, P270, P280, P301+P316, P318, P319, P321, P330, P391, P405, P501
NFPA 704 (fire diamond)	2 2 0
Flash point	72–77 °C; 162–171 °F; 345–350 K
- Lethal dose or concentration (LD, LC)
LD_{50} (median dose)	113–800 mg/kg (rat, oral); 250 mg/kg (rabbit, oral); 135 mg/kg (mouse, oral); 150 mg/kg (guinea pig, oral)
- NIOSH (US health exposure limits)
PEL (Permissible)	TWA 1 mg/m^{3} [skin]
REL (Recommended)	Ca TWA 0.5 mg/m^{3}
IDLH (Immediate danger)	500 mg/m^{3}
- Except where otherwise noted, data are given for materials in their standard state (at 25 °C [77 °F], 100 kPa). verify (what is ?) Infobox references

Dichlorodiphenyltrichloroethane (DDT) is a colorless, tasteless, and almost odorless crystalline chemical compound, an organochloride. Originally developed as an insecticide, it became infamous for its environmental impacts. DDT was first synthesized in 1874 by the Austrian chemist Othmar Zeidler. DDT's insecticidal action was discovered by the Swiss chemist Paul Hermann Müller in 1939. DDT was used in the second half of World War II to limit the spread of the insect-borne diseases malaria and typhus among civilians and troops. Müller was awarded the Nobel Prize in Physiology or Medicine in 1948 "for his discovery of the high efficiency of DDT as a contact poison against several arthropods". The World Health Organization's (WHO) anti-malaria campaign of the 1950s and 1960s relied heavily on DDT and the results were promising, though there was a resurgence in developing countries afterwards.

By October 1945, DDT was available for public sale in the United States. Although it was promoted by government and industry for use as an agricultural and household pesticide, there were also concerns about its use from the beginning. Opposition to DDT was focused by the 1962 publication of Rachel Carson's book Silent Spring. It talked about environmental impacts that correlated with the widespread use of DDT in agriculture in the United States, and it questioned the logic of broadcasting potentially dangerous chemicals into the environment with little prior investigation of their environmental and health effects. The book cited claims that DDT and other pesticides caused cancer and that their agricultural use was a threat to wildlife, particularly birds. Although Carson never directly called for an outright ban on the use of DDT, its publication was a seminal event for the environmental movement and resulted in a large public outcry that eventually led, in 1972, to a ban on DDT's agricultural use in the United States. Along with the passage of the Endangered Species Act, the United States ban on DDT is a major factor in the comeback of the bald eagle (the national bird of the United States) and the peregrine falcon from near-extinction in the contiguous United States.

The evolution of DDT resistance and the harm both to humans and the environment led many governments to curtail DDT use. A worldwide ban on agricultural use was formalized under the Stockholm Convention on Persistent Organic Pollutants, which has been in effect since 2004. Recognizing that total elimination in many malaria-prone countries is currently unfeasible in the absence of affordable/effective alternatives for disease control, the convention exempts public health use within WHO guidelines from the ban.

DDT still has limited use in disease vector control because of its effectiveness in killing mosquitos and thus reducing malarial infections for which they are the vector, but that use is controversial due to environmental and health concerns. DDT is one of many tools to fight malaria, which remains the primary public health challenge in many countries. WHO guidelines require that absence of DDT resistance must be confirmed before using it. Resistance is largely due to agricultural use, in much greater quantities than required for disease prevention.

== Properties and chemistry ==
DDT is similar in structure to the insecticide methoxychlor and the acaricide dicofol. It is highly hydrophobic and nearly insoluble in water but has good solubility in most organic solvents, fats and oils. DDT does not occur naturally and is synthesised by consecutive Friedel–Crafts reactions between chloral (CCl_{3}CHO) and two equivalents of chlorobenzene (C_{6}H_{5}Cl), in the presence of an acidic catalyst. DDT has been marketed under trade names including Anofex, Cezarex, Chlorophenothane, Dicophane, Dinocide, Gesarol, Guesapon, Guesarol, Gyron, Ixodex, Neocid, Neocidol and Zerdane; INN is clofenotane.

=== Isomers and related compounds ===
Commercial DDT is a mixture of several closely related compounds. Due to the nature of the chemical reaction used to synthesize DDT, several combinations of ortho and para arene substitution patterns are formed. The major component (77%) is the desired p,p' isomer. The o,p' isomeric impurity is also present in significant amounts (15%). Dichlorodiphenyldichloroethylene (DDE) and dichlorodiphenyldichloroethane (DDD) make up the balance of impurities in commercial samples. DDE and DDD are also the major metabolites and environmental breakdown products. DDT, DDE and DDD are sometimes referred to collectively as DDX.

Components of commercial DDT

p,p'-DDT
(desired compound)

o,p'-DDT
(isomeric impurity)

p,p'-DDE
(impurity)

p,p'-DDD
(impurity)

=== Production and use ===
DDT has been formulated in multiple forms, including solutions in xylene or petroleum distillates, emulsifiable concentrates, water-wettable powders, granules, aerosols, smoke candles and charges for vaporizers and lotions.

From 1950 to 1980, DDT was extensively used in agriculture – more than 40,000 tonnes each year worldwide – and it has been estimated that a total of 1.8 million tonnes have been produced globally since the 1940s. In the United States, it was manufactured by some 15 companies, including Monsanto, Ciba, Montrose Chemical Company, Pennwalt, and Velsicol Chemical Corporation. Production peaked in 1963 at 82,000 tonnes per year. More than 600,000 tonnes (1.35 billion pounds) were applied in the US before the 1972 ban. Usage peaked in 1959 at about 36,000 tonnes.

China ceased production in 2007, leaving India the only country still manufacturing DDT; it is the largest consumer. In 2009, 3,314 tonnes were produced for malaria control and visceral leishmaniasis. In recent years, in addition to India, just seven other countries, all in Africa, are still using DDT.

=== Mechanism of insecticide action ===
In insects, DDT opens voltage-sensitive sodium ion channels in neurons, causing them to fire spontaneously, which leads to spasms and eventual death. Insects with certain mutations in their sodium channel gene are resistant to DDT and similar insecticides. DDT resistance is also conferred by up-regulation of genes expressing cytochrome P450 in some insect species, as greater quantities of some enzymes of this group accelerate the toxin's metabolism into inactive metabolites. Genomic studies in the model genetic organism Drosophila melanogaster revealed that high level DDT resistance is polygenic, involving multiple resistance mechanisms. In the absence of genetic adaptation, Roberts and Andre 1994 find behavioral avoidance nonetheless provides insects with some protection against DDT. The M918T mutation event produces dramatic kdr for pyrethroids but Usherwood et al. 2005 find it is entirely ineffective against DDT. Scott 2019 believes this test in Drosophila oocytes holds for oocytes in general.

== History ==
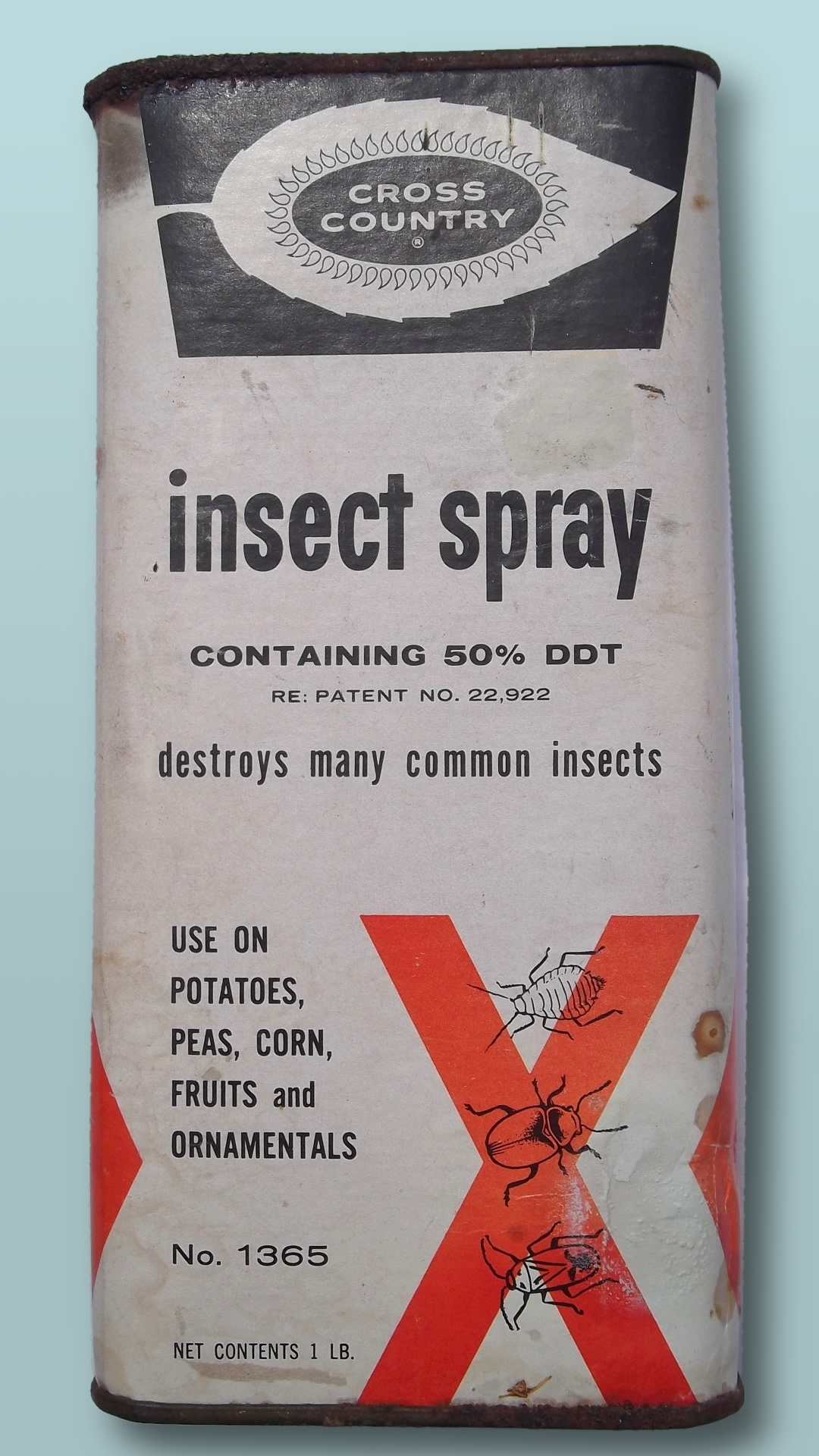
Commercial product concentrate containing 50% DDT, circa 1960s

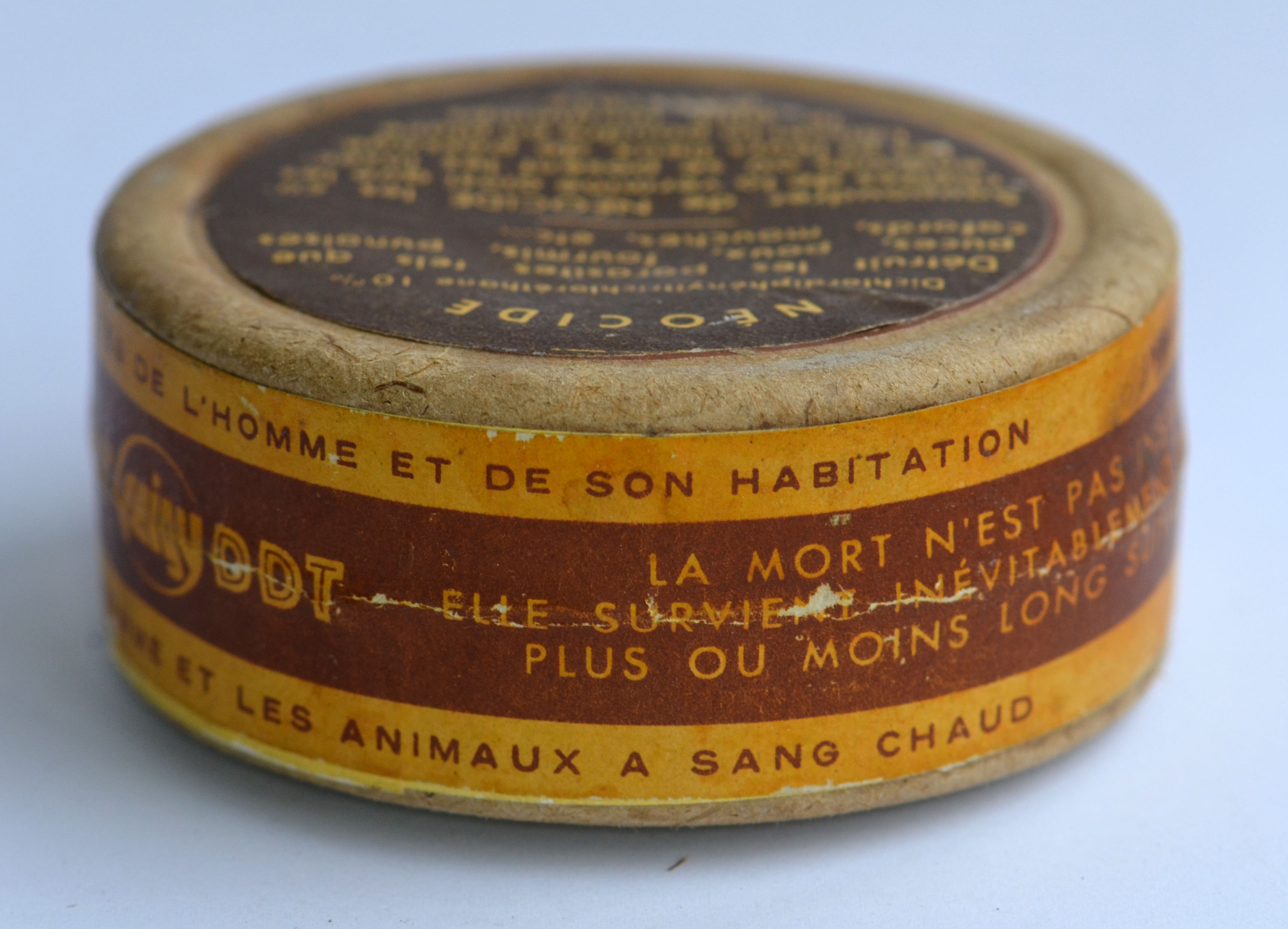
Commercial product of Ciba-Geigy Néocide (powder box, 50 g) containing 10% DDT, made in France

External audio
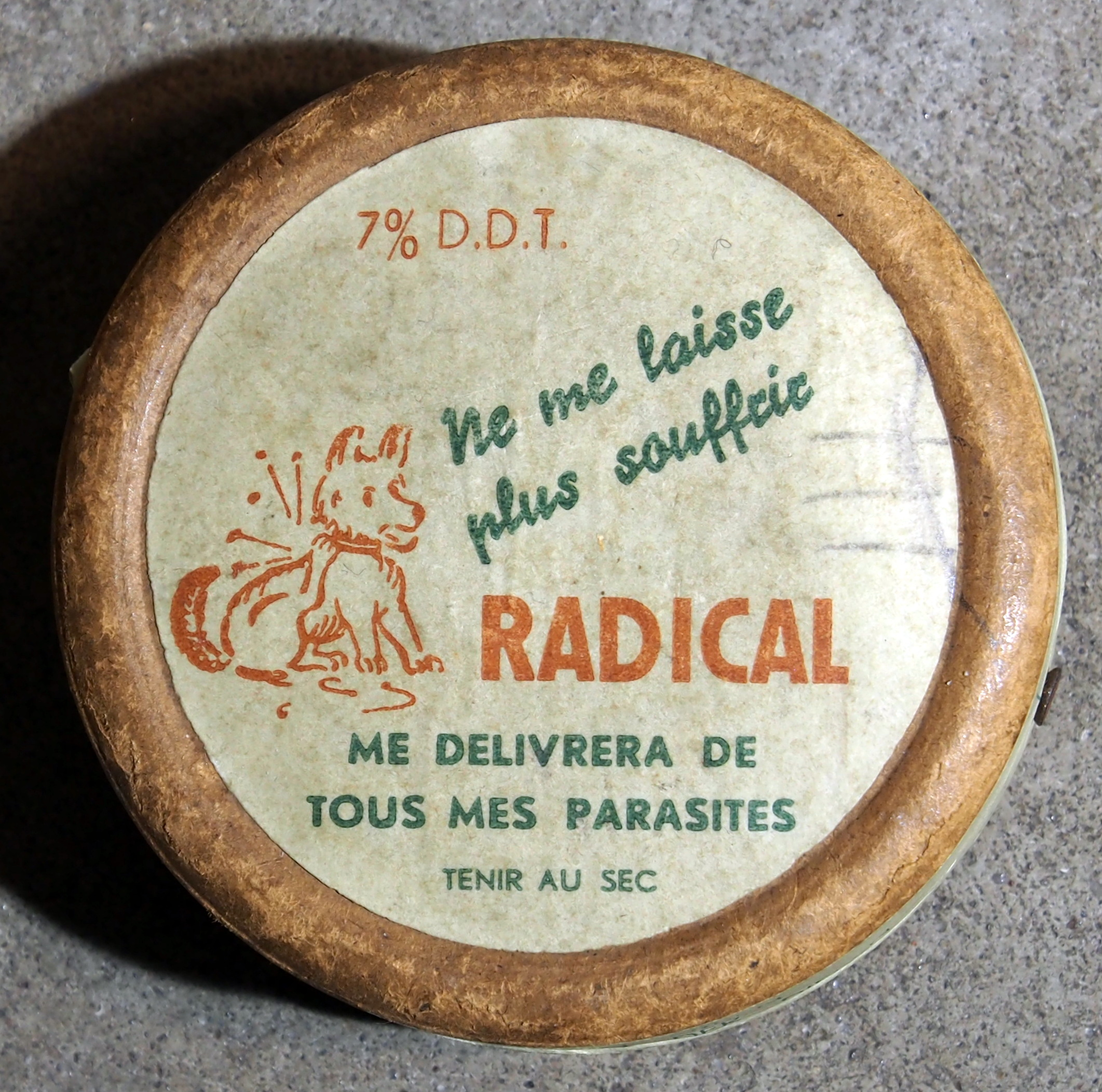
- "Episode 207: DDT", Science History Institute

DDT was first synthesized in 1874 by Othmar Zeidler under the supervision of Adolf von Baeyer. It was further described in 1929 in a dissertation by W. Bausch and in two subsequent publications in 1930. The insecticide properties of "multiple chlorinated aliphatic or fat-aromatic alcohols with at least one trichloromethane group" were described in a patent in 1934 by Wolfgang von Leuthold. DDT's insecticidal properties were not, however, discovered until 1939 by the Swiss scientist Paul Hermann Müller, who was awarded the 1948 Nobel Prize in Physiology and Medicine for his efforts.

=== Use in the 1940s and 1950s ===
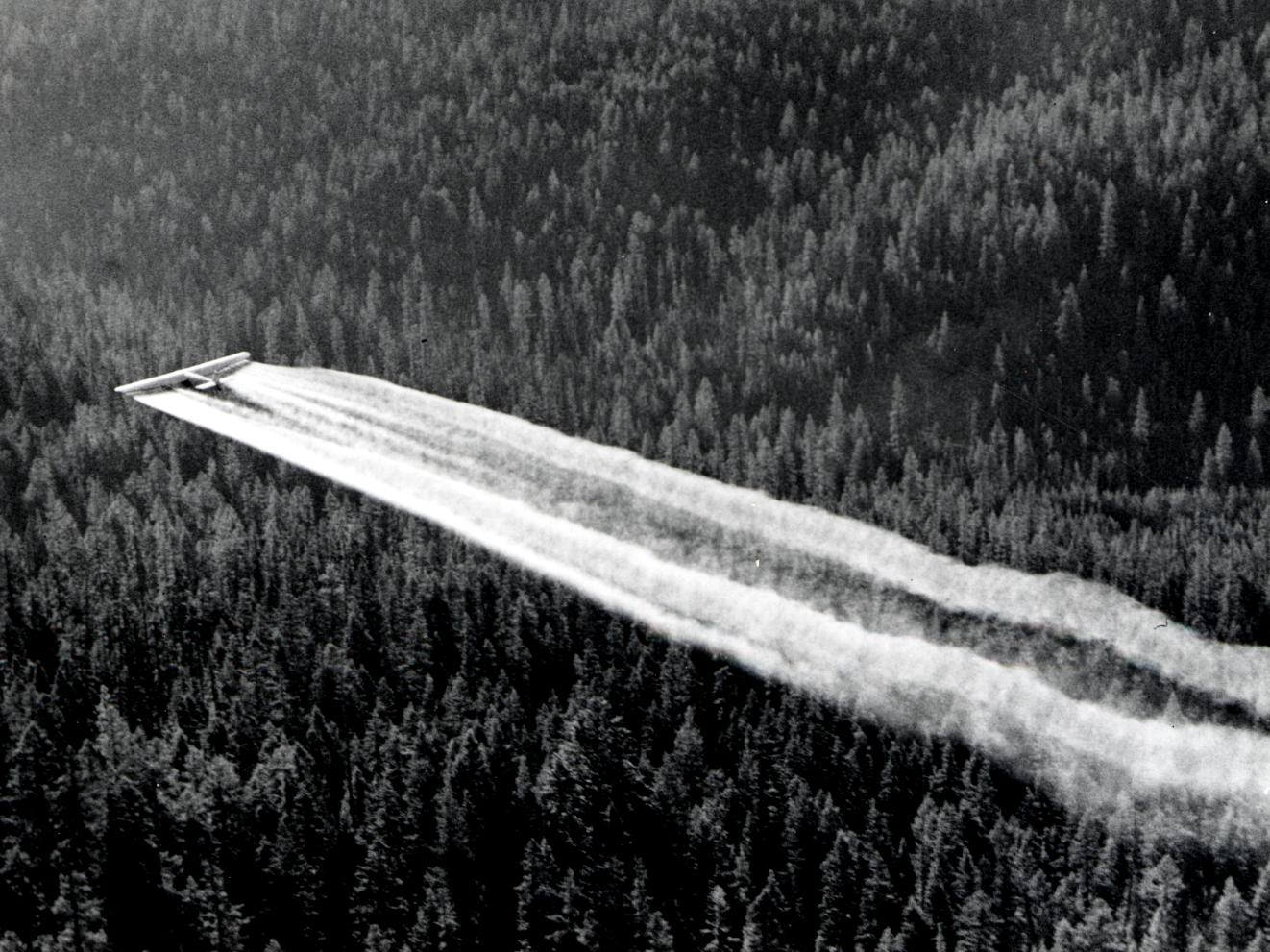
An airplane spraying DDT over Baker County, Oregon as part of a spruce budworm control project, 1955

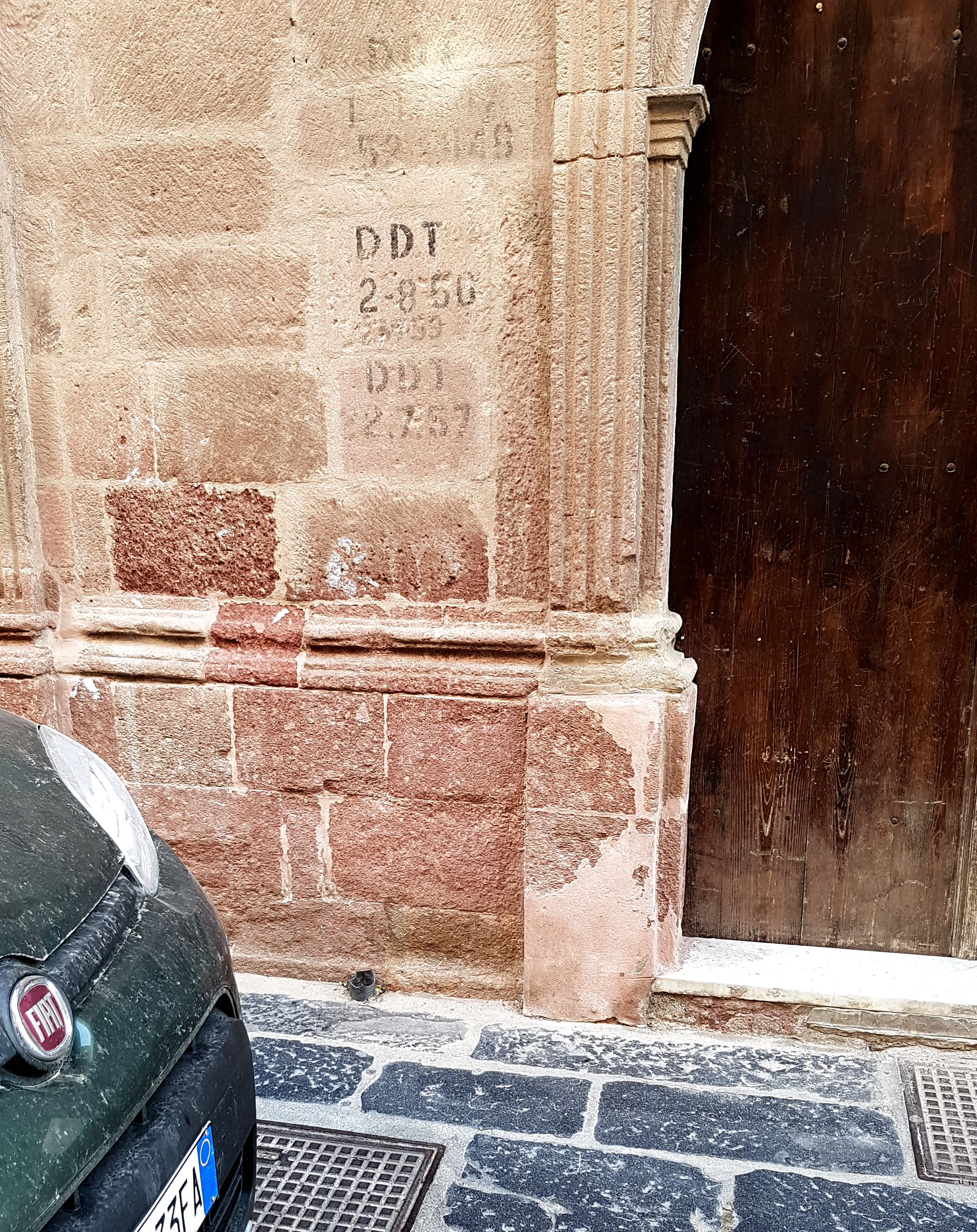
DDT spray log in Bosa (Sardinia)

DDT is the best-known of several chlorine-containing pesticides used in the 1940s and 1950s. During this time, the use of DDT was driven by protecting US soldiers from diseases in tropical areas. Both UK and US scientists hoped to use it to control spread of malaria, typhus, dysentery, and typhoid fever among overseas soldiers, especially considering that the pyrethrum was harder to access since it came mainly from Japan. Due to the potency of DDT, it was not long before the US War Production Board placed it on military supply lists in 1942 and 1943 and encouraged its production for overseas use. Enthusiasm regarding DDT became obvious through the US government's advertising campaigns of posters depicting US fighting the Axis powers and insects and through media publications celebrating its military uses. In the South Pacific, it was sprayed aerially for malaria and dengue fever control with spectacular effects. While DDT's chemical and insecticidal properties were important factors in these victories, advances in application equipment coupled with competent organization and sufficient manpower were also crucial to the success of these programs.

In 1945, DDT was made available to farmers as an agricultural insecticide and played a role in the elimination of malaria in Europe and North America. Despite concerns emerging in the scientific community, and lack of research, the FDA considered it safe up to 7 parts per million in food. There was a large economic incentive to push DDT into the market and sell it to farmers, governments, and individuals to control diseases and increase food production.

DDT was also a way for US influence to reach abroad through DDT-spraying campaigns. In the 1944 issue of Life magazine there was a feature regarding the Italian program showing pictures of US public health officials in uniforms spraying DDT on Italian families.

In 1955, the WHO commenced a program to eradicate malaria in countries with low to moderate transmission rates worldwide, relying largely on DDT for mosquito control and rapid diagnosis and treatment to reduce transmission. The program eliminated the disease in "North America, Europe, the former Soviet Union", and in "Taiwan, much of the Caribbean, the Balkans, parts of northern Africa, the northern region of Australia, and a large swath of the South Pacific" and dramatically reduced mortality in Sri Lanka and India.

However, failure to sustain the program, increasing mosquito tolerance to DDT, and increasing parasite tolerance led to a resurgence. In many areas early successes partially or completely reversed, and in some cases rates of transmission increased. The program succeeded in eliminating malaria only in areas with "high socio-economic status, well-organized healthcare systems, and relatively less intensive or seasonal malaria transmission".

DDT was less effective in tropical regions due to the continuous life cycle of mosquitoes and poor infrastructure. It was applied in sub-Saharan Africa by various colonial states, but the 'global' WHO eradication program did not include the region. Mortality rates in that area never declined to the same dramatic extent, and now constitute the bulk of malarial deaths worldwide, especially following the disease's resurgence as a result of resistance to drug treatments and the spread of the deadly malarial variant caused by Plasmodium falciparum. Eradication was abandoned in 1969 and attention instead focused on controlling and treating the disease. Spraying programs (especially using DDT) were curtailed due to concerns over safety and environmental effects, as well as problems in administrative, managerial and financial implementation. Efforts shifted from spraying to the use of bednets impregnated with insecticides and other interventions.

=== United States ban ===
By October 1945 DDT was available for public sale in the United States, both as an agricultural pesticide and as a household insecticide. Although its use was promoted by government and the agricultural industry, US scientists such as FDA pharmacologist Herbert O. Calvery expressed concern over possible hazards associated with DDT as early as 1944. In 1947, Bradbury Robinson, a physician and nutritionist practicing in St. Louis, Michigan, warned of the dangers of using the pesticide DDT in agriculture. DDT had been researched and manufactured in St. Louis by the Michigan Chemical Corporation, later purchased by Velsicol Chemical Corporation, and had become an important part of the local economy. Citing research performed by Michigan State University in 1946, Robinson, a past president of the local Conservation Club, opined that:

perhaps the greatest danger from D.D.T. is that its extensive use in farm areas is most likely to upset the natural balances, not only killing beneficial insects in great number but by bringing about the death of fish, birds, and other forms of wild life either by their feeding on insects killed by D.D.T. or directly by ingesting the poison.

As its production and use increased, public response was mixed. At the same time that DDT was hailed as part of the "world of tomorrow", concerns were expressed about its potential to kill harmless and beneficial insects (particularly pollinators), birds, fish, and eventually humans. The issue of toxicity was complicated, partly because DDT's effects varied from species to species, and partly because consecutive exposures could accumulate, causing damage comparable to large doses. A number of states attempted to regulate DDT. In the 1950s the federal government began tightening regulations governing its use. These events received little attention. Women like Dorothy Colson and Mamie Ella Plyler of Claxton, Georgia, gathered evidence about DDT's effects and wrote to the Georgia Department of Public Health, the National Health Council in New York City, and other organizations.

In 1957 The New York Times reported an unsuccessful struggle to restrict DDT use in Nassau County, New York, and the issue came to the attention of the popular naturalist-author Rachel Carson when a friend, Olga Huckins, wrote to her including an article she had written in the Boston Globe about the devastation of her local bird population after DDT spraying. William Shawn, editor of The New Yorker, urged her to write a piece on the subject, which developed into her 1962 book Silent Spring. The book argued that pesticides, including DDT, were poisoning both wildlife and the environment and were endangering human health. Silent Spring was a best seller, and public reaction to it launched the modern environmental movement in the United States. The year after it appeared, President John F. Kennedy ordered his Science Advisory Committee to investigate Carson's claims. The committee's report "add[ed] up to a fairly thorough-going vindication of Rachel Carson's Silent Spring thesis", in the words of the journal Science, and recommended a phaseout of "persistent toxic pesticides". In 1965, the US military removed DDT from the military supply system due in part to the development of resistance by body lice to DDT; it was replaced by lindane.

In the mid-1960s, DDT became a prime target of the burgeoning environmental movement, as concern about DDT and its effects began to rise in local communities. In 1966, a fish kill in Suffolk County, New York, was linked to a 5,000-gallon DDT dump by the county's mosquito commission, leading a group of scientists and lawyers to file a lawsuit to stop the county's further use of DDT. A year later, the group, led by Victor Yannacone and Charles Wurster, founded the Environmental Defense Fund (EDF), along with scientists Art Cooley and Dennis Puleston, and brought a string of lawsuits against DDT and other persistent pesticides in Michigan and Wisconsin.

Around the same time, evidence was mounting further about DDT causing catastrophic declines in wildlife reproduction, especially in birds of prey like peregrine falcons, bald eagles, ospreys, and brown pelicans, whose eggshells became so thin that they often cracked before hatching. Toxicologists like David Peakall were measuring DDE levels in the eggs of peregrine falcons and California condors and finding that increased levels corresponded with thinner shells. Compounding the effect was DDT's persistence in the environment, as it was unable to dissolve in water, and ended up accumulating in animal fat and disrupting hormone metabolism across a wide range of species.

In response to an EDF suit, the US District Court of Appeals in 1971 ordered the EPA to begin the de-registration procedure for DDT. After an initial six-month review process, William Ruckelshaus, the Agency's first Administrator rejected an immediate suspension of DDT's registration, citing studies from the EPA's internal staff stating that DDT was not an imminent danger. However, these findings were criticized, as they were performed mostly by economic entomologists inherited from the United States Department of Agriculture, who many environmentalists felt were biased towards agribusiness and understated concerns about human health and wildlife. The decision thus created controversy.

The EPA held seven months of hearings in 1971–1972, with scientists giving evidence for and against DDT. In the summer of 1972, Ruckelshaus announced the cancellation of most uses of DDT – exempting public health uses under some conditions. Again, this caused controversy. Immediately after the announcement, both the EDF and the DDT manufacturers filed suit against EPA. Many in the agricultural community were concerned that food production would be severely impacted, while proponents of pesticides warned of increased breakouts of insect-borne diseases and questioned the accuracy of giving animals high amounts of pesticides for cancer potential. Industry sought to overturn the ban, while the EDF wanted a comprehensive ban. The cases were consolidated, and in 1973 the United States Court of Appeals for the District of Columbia Circuit ruled that the EPA had acted properly in banning DDT. During the late 1970s, the EPA also began banning organochlorines, pesticides that were chemically similar to DDT. These included aldrin, dieldrin, chlordane, heptachlor, toxaphene, and mirex.

Some uses of DDT continued under the public health exemption. For example, in June 1979, the California Department of Health Services was permitted to use DDT to suppress flea vectors of bubonic plague. DDT continued to be produced in the United States for foreign markets until 1985, when over 300 tons were exported.

=== International usage restrictions ===
In the 1970s and 1980s, agricultural use was banned in most developed countries, beginning with Hungary in 1968 – although in practice it continued to be used through at least 1970. This was followed by Norway and Sweden in 1970, West Germany and the US in 1972, but not in the UK until 1984.

In contrast to West Germany, in the German Democratic Republic DDT was used until 1988. Especially of relevance were large-scale applications in forestry in the years 1982–1984, with the aim to combat bark beetle and pine moth. As a consequence, DDT concentrations in eastern German forest soils are still significantly higher compared to soils in the former western German states.

By 1991, total bans, including for disease control, were in place in at least 26 countries; for example, Cuba in 1970, the US in the 1980s, Singapore in 1984, Chile in 1985, and the Republic of Korea in 1986.

The Stockholm Convention on Persistent Organic Pollutants, which took effect in 2004, put a global ban on several persistent organic pollutants, and restricted DDT use to vector control. The convention was ratified by more than 170 countries. Recognizing that total elimination in many malaria-prone countries is currently unfeasible in the absence of affordable/effective alternatives, the convention exempts public health use within World Health Organization (WHO) guidelines from the ban. Resolution 60.18 of the World Health Assembly commits WHO to the Stockholm Convention's aim of reducing and ultimately eliminating DDT. Malaria Foundation International states, "The outcome of the treaty is arguably better than the status quo going into the negotiations. For the first time, there is now an insecticide which is restricted to vector control only, meaning that the selection of resistant mosquitoes will be slower than before."

Despite the worldwide ban, agricultural use continued in India, North Korea, and possibly elsewhere. As of 2013, an estimated 3,000 to 4,000 tons of DDT were produced for disease vector control, including 2,786 tons in India. DDT is applied to the inside walls of homes to kill or repel mosquitoes. This intervention, called indoor residual spraying (IRS), greatly reduces environmental damage. It also reduces the incidence of DDT resistance. For comparison, treating 40 hectares (99 acres) of cotton during a typical US growing season requires the same amount of chemical to treat roughly 1,700 homes.

== Environmental impact ==
Degradation of DDT to form DDE (by elimination of HCl, left) and DDD (by reductive dechlorination, right)

DDT is a persistent organic pollutant that is readily adsorbed to soils and sediments, which can act both as sinks and as long-term sources of exposure affecting organisms. Depending on environmental conditions, its soil half-life can range from 22 days to 30 years. Routes of loss and degradation include runoff, volatilization, photolysis and aerobic and anaerobic biodegradation. Due to hydrophobic properties, in aquatic ecosystems DDT and its metabolites are absorbed by aquatic organisms and adsorbed on suspended particles, leaving little DDT dissolved in the water (however, its half-life in aquatic environments is listed by the National Pesticide Information Center as 150 years). Its breakdown products and metabolites, DDE and DDD, are also persistent and have similar chemical and physical properties. DDT and its breakdown products are transported from warmer areas to the Arctic by the phenomenon of global distillation, where they then accumulate in the region's food web.

Medical researchers in 1974 found a measurable and significant difference in the presence of DDT in human milk between mothers who lived in New Brunswick and mothers who lived in Nova Scotia, "possibly because of the wider use of insecticide sprays in the past".

Because of its lipophilic properties, DDT can bioaccumulate, especially in predatory birds. DDT is toxic to a wide range of living organisms, including marine animals such as crayfish, daphnids, sea shrimp and many species of fish. DDT, DDE and DDD magnify through the food chain, with apex predators such as raptor birds concentrating more chemicals than other animals in the same environment. They are stored mainly in body fat. DDT and DDE are resistant to metabolism; in humans, their half-lives are 6 and up to 10 years, respectively. In the United States, these chemicals were detected in almost all human blood samples tested by the Centers for Disease Control in 2005, though their levels have sharply declined since most uses were banned. Estimated dietary intake has declined, although FDA food tests commonly detect it.

Despite being banned for many years, in 2018 research showed that DDT residues are still present in European soils and Spanish rivers.

=== Eggshell thinning ===
The chemical and its breakdown products DDE and DDD caused eggshell thinning and population declines in multiple North American and European bird of prey species. Both laboratory experiments and field studies confirmed this effect. The effect was first conclusively proven at Bellow Island in Lake Michigan during University of Michigan–funded studies on American herring gulls in the mid-1960s. DDE-related eggshell thinning is considered a major reason for the decline of the bald eagle, brown pelican, peregrine falcon and osprey. However, birds vary in their sensitivity to these chemicals, with birds of prey, waterfowl and song birds being more susceptible than chickens and related species. Even in 2010, California condors that feed on sea lions at Big Sur that in turn feed in the Palos Verdes Shelf area of the Montrose Chemical Superfund site exhibited continued thin-shell problems, though DDT's role in the decline of the California condor is disputed.

The biological thinning mechanism is not entirely understood, but DDE appears to be more potent than DDT, and strong evidence indicates that p,p'-DDE inhibits calcium ATPase in the membrane of the shell gland and reduces the transport of calcium carbonate from blood into the eggshell gland. This results in a dose-dependent thickness reduction. Other evidence indicates that o,p'-DDT disrupts female reproductive tract development, later impairing eggshell quality. Multiple mechanisms may be at work, or different mechanisms may operate in different species.

== Human health ==
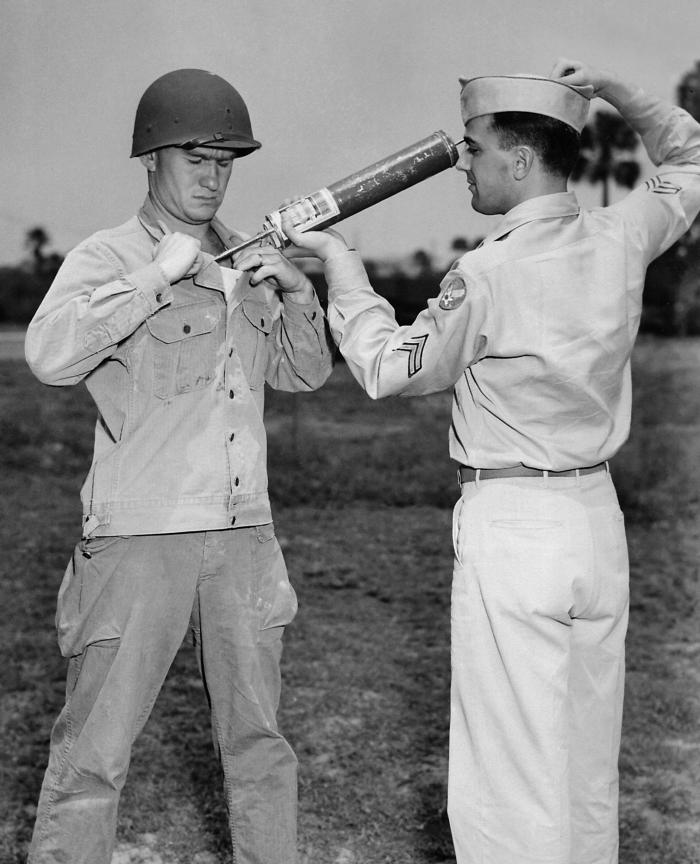
A US soldier is demonstrating DDT hand-spraying equipment. DDT was used to control the spread of typhus-carrying lice.

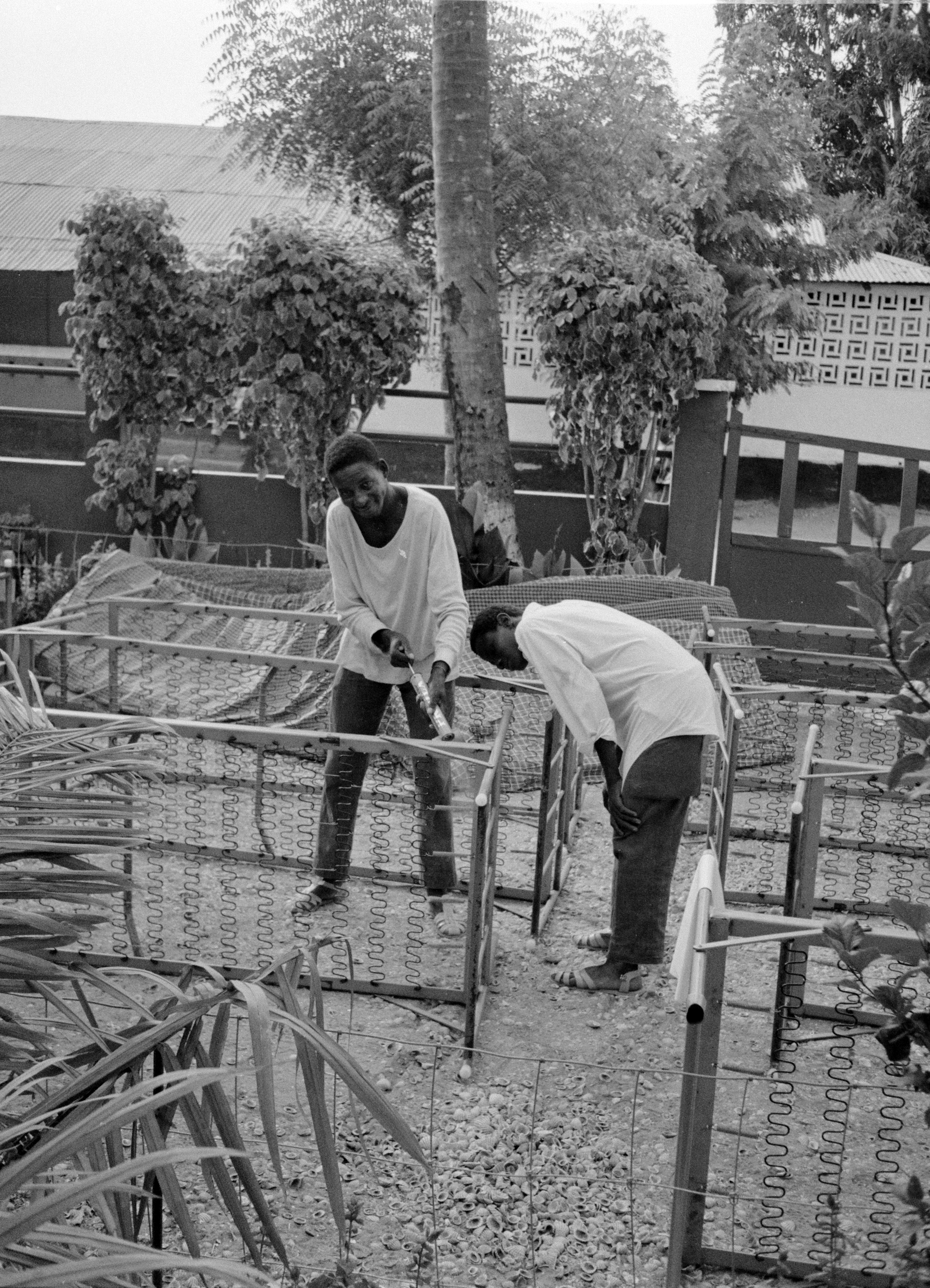
Spraying hospital beds with DDT, PAIGC hospital of Ziguinchor, 1973

Biomagnification is the build up of toxins in a food chain. The DDT concentration is in parts per million. As the trophic level increases in a food chain, the amount of toxic build up also increases. The X's represent the amount of toxic build up accumulating as the trophic level increases. Toxins build up in organism's tissues and fat. Predators accumulate higher toxins than the prey.

DDT is an endocrine disruptor. It is considered likely to be a human carcinogen although the majority of studies suggest it is not directly genotoxic. DDE acts as a weak androgen receptor antagonist, but not as an estrogen. p,p'-DDT, DDT's main component, has little or no androgenic or estrogenic activity. The minor component o,p'-DDT has weak estrogenic activity.

=== Acute toxicity ===
DDT is classified as "moderately toxic" by the US National Toxicology Program (NTP) and "moderately hazardous" by WHO, based on the rat oral LD_{50} of 113 mg/kg. Indirect exposure is considered relatively non-toxic for humans. High-dose exposure to DDT can have effects on animals which could cause headaches, tremors, and convulsions. Laboratory animals were tested and were given a single oral dose of about 50mg DDT/kg a day. They were seen to have tremors, hyperactivity or a hunched appearance in doses as low as 27 mg DDT/kg. Similar effects have been seen across multiple species with exposure to higher dose ranges, including humans. In a controlled setting, humans were exposed to 6mg DDT/kg orally and were not seen to be ill, but did have perspiration, headaches, and nausea. At doses of 16mg DDT/kg or higher, convulsions were reported. At doses of around 22 mg DDT/kg, dizziness, confusion, tremors, headaches, and fatigue were all shown within 10 hours of dosing. The symptoms seemed to disappear within the next 24 hours after dosing.

=== Chronic toxicity ===
Primarily through the tendency for DDT to build up in areas of the body with high lipid content, chronic exposure can affect reproductive capabilities and the embryo or fetus.

- A review article in The Lancet states: "research has shown that exposure to DDT at amounts that would be needed in malaria control might cause preterm birth and early weaning ... toxicological evidence shows endocrine-disrupting properties; human data also indicate possible disruption in semen quality, menstruation, gestational length, and duration of lactation".
- Other studies document decreases in semen quality among men with high exposures (generally from indoor residual spraying).
- Studies are inconsistent on whether high blood DDT or DDE levels increase time to pregnancy. In mothers with high DDE blood serum levels, daughters may have up to a 32% increase in the probability of conceiving, but increased DDT levels have been associated with a 16% decrease in one study.
- Indirect exposure of mothers through workers directly in contact with DDT is associated with an increase in spontaneous abortions.
- Other studies found that DDT or DDE interfere with proper thyroid function in pregnancy and childhood.
- Mothers with high levels of DDT circulating in their blood during pregnancy were found to be more likely to give birth to children who would go on to develop autism.

=== Carcinogenicity ===
In 2015, the International Agency for Research on Cancer classified DDT as Group 2A "probably carcinogenic to humans". Previous assessments by the US National Toxicology Program classified it as "reasonably anticipated to be a carcinogen" and by the EPA classified DDT, DDE and DDD as class B2 "probable" carcinogens; these evaluations were based mainly on animal studies.

A 2005 The Lancet review stated that occupational DDT exposure was associated with increased pancreatic cancer risk in 2 case control studies, but another study showed no DDE dose-effect association. Results regarding a possible association with liver cancer and biliary tract cancer are conflicting: workers who did not have direct occupational DDT contact showed increased risk. White men had an increased risk, but not white women or black men. Results about an association with multiple myeloma, prostate and testicular cancer, endometrial cancer and colorectal cancer have been inconclusive or generally do not support an association. A 2017 review of liver cancer studies concluded that "organochlorine pesticides, including DDT, may increase hepatocellular carcinoma risk".

A 2009 review, whose co-authors included persons engaged in DDT-related litigation, reached broadly similar conclusions, with an equivocal association with testicular cancer. Case–control studies did not support an association with leukemia or lymphoma.

==== Breast cancer ====
The question of whether DDT or DDE are risk factors in breast cancer has not been conclusively answered. Several meta analyses of observational studies have concluded that there is no overall relationship between DDT exposure and breast cancer risk. The United States Institute of Medicine reviewed data on the association of breast cancer with DDT exposure in 2012 and concluded that a causative relationship could neither be proven nor disproven.

A 2007 case-control study using archived blood samples found that breast cancer risk was increased 5-fold among women who were born prior to 1931 and who had high serum DDT levels in 1963. Reasoning that DDT use became widespread in 1945 and peaked around 1950, they concluded that the ages of 14–20 were a critical period in which DDT exposure leads to increased risk. This study, which suggests a connection between DDT exposure and breast cancer that would not be picked up by most studies, has received variable commentary in third-party reviews. One review suggested that "previous studies that measured exposure in older women may have missed the critical period". The US National Toxicology Program notes that while the majority of studies have not found a relationship between DDT exposure and breast cancer that positive associations have been seen in a "few studies among women with higher levels of exposure and among certain subgroups of women".

A 2015 case control study identified a link (odds ratio 3.4) between in-utero exposure (as estimated from archived maternal blood samples) and breast cancer diagnosis in daughters. The findings "support classification of DDT as an endocrine disruptor, a predictor of breast cancer, and a marker of high risk".

== Malaria control ==
Malaria remains the primary public health challenge in many countries. In 2015, there were 214 million cases of malaria worldwide resulting in an estimated 438,000 deaths, 90% of which occurred in Africa. DDT is one of many tools to fight the disease. Its use in this context has been called everything from a "miracle weapon [that is] like Kryptonite to the mosquitoes", to "toxic colonialism".

Before DDT, eliminating mosquito breeding grounds by drainage or poisoning with Paris green or pyrethrum was sometimes successful. In parts of the world with rising living standards, the elimination of malaria was often a collateral benefit of the introduction of window screens and improved sanitation. A variety of usually simultaneous interventions represents best practice. These include antimalarial drugs to prevent or treat infection; improvements in public health infrastructure to diagnose, sequester and treat infected individuals; bednets and other methods intended to keep mosquitoes from biting humans; and vector control strategies such as larviciding with insecticides, ecological controls such as draining mosquito breeding grounds or introducing fish to eat larvae and indoor residual spraying (IRS) with insecticides, possibly including DDT. IRS involves the treatment of interior walls and ceilings with insecticides. It is particularly effective against mosquitoes, since many species rest on an indoor wall before or after feeding. DDT is one of 12 WHO–approved IRS insecticides.

The WHO's anti-malaria campaign of the 1950s and 1960s relied heavily on DDT and the results were promising, though temporary in developing countries. Experts tie malarial resurgence to multiple factors, including poor leadership, management and funding of malaria control programs; poverty; civil unrest; and increased irrigation. The evolution of resistance to first-generation drugs (e.g. chloroquine) and to insecticides exacerbated the situation. Resistance was largely fueled by unrestricted agricultural use. Resistance and the harm both to humans and the environment led many governments to curtail DDT use in vector control and agriculture. In 2006 WHO reversed a longstanding policy against DDT by recommending that it be used as an indoor pesticide in regions where malaria is a major problem.

Once the mainstay of anti-malaria campaigns, as of 2019 only five countries used DDT for IRS.

=== Initial effectiveness ===
When it was introduced in World War II, DDT was effective in reducing malaria morbidity and mortality. WHO's anti-malaria campaign, which consisted mostly of spraying DDT and rapid treatment and diagnosis to break the transmission cycle, was initially successful as well. For example, in Sri Lanka, the program reduced cases from about one million per year before spraying to just 18 in 1963 and 29 in 1964. Thereafter the program was halted to save money and malaria rebounded to 600,000 cases in 1968 and the first quarter of 1969. The country resumed DDT vector control but the mosquitoes had evolved resistance in the interim, presumably because of continued agricultural use. The program switched to malathion, but despite initial successes, malaria continued its resurgence into the 1980s.

DDT remains on WHO's list of insecticides recommended for IRS. After the appointment of Arata Kochi as head of its anti-malaria division, WHO's policy shifted from recommending IRS only in areas of seasonal or episodic transmission of malaria, to advocating it in areas of continuous, intense transmission. WHO reaffirmed its commitment to phasing out DDT, aiming "to achieve a 30% cut in the application of DDT world-wide by 2014 and its total phase-out by the early 2020s if not sooner" while simultaneously combating malaria. WHO plans to implement alternatives to DDT to achieve this goal.

South Africa continues to use DDT under WHO guidelines. In 1996, the country switched to alternative insecticides and malaria incidence increased dramatically. Returning to DDT and introducing new drugs brought malaria back under control. Malaria cases increased in South America after countries in that continent stopped using DDT. Research data showed a strong negative relationship between DDT residual house sprayings and malaria. In a research from 1993 to 1995, Ecuador increased its use of DDT and achieved a 61% reduction in malaria rates, while each of the other countries that gradually decreased its DDT use had large increases.

=== Mosquito resistance ===
In some areas, resistance reduced DDT's effectiveness. WHO guidelines require that absence of resistance must be confirmed before using the chemical. Resistance is largely due to agricultural use, in much greater quantities than required for disease prevention.

Resistance was noted early in spray campaigns. Paul Russell, former head of the Allied Anti-Malaria campaign, observed in 1956 that "resistance has appeared after six or seven years". Resistance has been detected in Sri Lanka, Pakistan, Turkey and Central America and it has largely been replaced by organophosphate or carbamate insecticides, e.g. malathion or bendiocarb.

In many parts of India, DDT is ineffective. Agricultural uses were banned in 1989 and its anti-malarial use has been declining. Urban use ended. One study concluded that "DDT is still a viable insecticide in indoor residual spraying owing to its effectivity in well supervised spray operation and high excito-repellency factor."

Studies of malaria-vector mosquitoes in KwaZulu-Natal Province, South Africa, found susceptibility to 4% DDT (WHO's susceptibility standard), in 63% of the samples, compared to the average of 87% in the same species caught in the open. The authors concluded that "Finding DDT resistance in the vector An. arabiensis, close to the area where we previously reported pyrethroid-resistance in the vector An. funestus Giles, indicates an urgent need to develop a strategy of insecticide resistance management for the malaria control programmes of southern Africa."

DDT can still be effective against resistant mosquitoes and the avoidance of DDT-sprayed walls by mosquitoes is an additional benefit of the chemical. For example, a 2007 study reported that resistant mosquitoes avoided treated huts. The researchers argued that DDT was the best pesticide for use in IRS (even though it did not afford the most protection from mosquitoes out of the three test chemicals) because the other pesticides worked primarily by killing or irritating mosquitoes – encouraging the development of resistance. Others argue that the avoidance behavior slows eradication. Unlike other insecticides such as pyrethroids, DDT requires long exposure to accumulate a lethal dose; however its irritant property shortens contact periods. "For these reasons, when comparisons have been made, better malaria control has generally been achieved with pyrethroids than with DDT." In India outdoor sleeping and night duties are common, implying that "the excito-repellent effect of DDT, often reported useful in other countries, actually promotes outdoor transmission".

=== Residents' concerns ===
IRS is effective if at least 80% of homes and barns in a residential area are sprayed. Lower coverage rates can jeopardize program effectiveness. Many residents resist DDT spraying, objecting to the lingering smell, stains on walls, and the potential exacerbation of problems with other insect pests. Pyrethroid insecticides (e.g. deltamethrin and lambda-cyhalothrin) can overcome some of these issues, increasing participation.

=== Human exposure ===
A 1994 study found that South Africans living in sprayed homes have levels that are several orders of magnitude greater than others. Breast milk from South African mothers contains high levels of DDT and DDE. It is unclear to what extent these levels arise from home spraying vs food residues. Evidence indicates that these levels are associated with infant neurological abnormalities.

Most studies of DDT's human health effects have been conducted in developed countries where DDT is not used and exposure is relatively low.

Illegal diversion to agriculture is also a concern as it is difficult to prevent and its subsequent use on crops is uncontrolled. For example, DDT use is widespread in Indian agriculture, particularly mango production and is reportedly used by librarians to protect books. Other examples include Ethiopia, where DDT intended for malaria control is reportedly used in coffee production, and Ghana where it is used for fishing. The residues in crops at levels unacceptable for export have been an important factor in bans in several tropical countries. Adding to this problem is a lack of skilled personnel and management.

=== Criticism of restrictions on DDT use ===
Restrictions on DDT usage have been criticized by some organizations opposed to the environmental movement, including Roger Bate of the pro-DDT advocacy group Africa Fighting Malaria (AFM) and the libertarian think tank Competitive Enterprise Institute; these sources oppose restrictions on DDT and attribute large numbers of deaths to such restrictions, sometimes in the millions. These arguments were rejected as "outrageous" by former WHO scientist Socrates Litsios. May Berenbaum, University of Illinois entomologist, says, "to blame environmentalists who oppose DDT for more deaths than Hitler is worse than irresponsible". More recently, Michael Palmer, a professor of chemistry at the University of Waterloo, has pointed out that DDT is still used to prevent malaria, that its declining use is primarily due to increases in manufacturing costs, and that in Africa, efforts to control malaria have been regional or local, not comprehensive.

The question that ... malaria control experts must ask is not "Which is worse, malaria or DDT?" but rather "What are the best tools to deploy for malaria control in a given situation, taking into account the on-the-ground challenges and needs, efficacy, cost, and collateral effects – both positive and negative – to human health and the environment, as well as the uncertainties associated with all these considerations?"

— Hans Herren & Charles Mbogo

Criticisms of a DDT "ban" often specifically reference the 1972 United States ban (with the erroneous implication that this constituted a worldwide ban and prohibited use of DDT in vector control). Reference is often made to Silent Spring, even though Carson never pushed for a DDT ban. John Quiggin and Tim Lambert wrote, "the most striking feature of the claim against Carson is the ease with which it can be refuted".

Investigative journalist Adam Sarvana and others characterize these notions as "myths" promoted principally by Roger Bate of AFM.

=== Alternatives ===
==== Insecticides ====
Organophosphate and carbamate insecticides, e.g. malathion and bendiocarb, respectively, are more expensive than DDT per kilogram and are applied at roughly the same dosage. Pyrethroids such as deltamethrin are also more expensive than DDT, but are applied more sparingly (0.02–0.3 g/m^{2} vs 1–2 g/m^{2}), so the net cost per house per treatment is about the same. DDT has one of the longest residual efficacy periods of any IRS insecticide, lasting 6 to 12 months. Pyrethroids will remain active for only 4 to 6 months, and organophosphates and carbamates remain active for 2 to 6 months. In many malaria-endemic countries, malaria transmission occurs year-round, meaning that the high expense of conducting a spray campaign (including hiring spray operators, procuring insecticides, and conducting pre-spray outreach campaigns to encourage people to be home and to accept the intervention) will need to occur multiple times per year for these shorter-lasting insecticides.

In 2019, the related compound difluorodiphenyltrichloroethane (DFDT) was described as a potentially more effective and therefore potentially safer alternative to DDT.

==== Non-chemical vector control ====
Before DDT, malaria was successfully eliminated or curtailed in several tropical areas by removing or poisoning mosquito breeding grounds and larva habitats, for example by eliminating standing water. These methods have seen little application in Africa for more than half a century. According to CDC, such methods are not practical in Africa because "Anopheles gambiae, one of the primary vectors of malaria in Africa, breeds in numerous small pools of water that form due to rainfall ... It is difficult, if not impossible, to predict when and where the breeding sites will form, and to find and treat them before the adults emerge."

The relative effectiveness of IRS versus other malaria control techniques (e.g. bednets or prompt access to anti-malarial drugs) varies and is dependent on local conditions.

A WHO study released in January 2008 found that mass distribution of insecticide-treated mosquito nets and artemisinin–based drugs cut malaria deaths in half in malaria-burdened Rwanda and Ethiopia. IRS with DDT did not play an important role in mortality reduction in these countries.

Vietnam has enjoyed declining malaria cases and a 97% mortality reduction after switching in 1991 from a poorly funded DDT-based campaign to a program based on prompt treatment, bednets and pyrethroid group insecticides.

In Mexico, effective and affordable chemical and non-chemical strategies were so successful that the Mexican DDT manufacturing plant ceased production due to lack of demand.

A review of fourteen studies in sub-Saharan Africa, covering insecticide-treated nets, residual spraying, chemoprophylaxis for children, chemoprophylaxis or intermittent treatment for pregnant women, a hypothetical vaccine and changing front–line drug treatment, found decision making limited by the lack of information on the costs and effects of many interventions, the small number of cost-effectiveness analyses, the lack of evidence on the costs and effects of packages of measures and the problems in generalizing or comparing studies that relate to specific settings and use different methodologies and outcome measures. The two cost-effectiveness estimates of DDT residual spraying examined were not found to provide an accurate estimate of the cost-effectiveness of DDT spraying; the resulting estimates may not be good predictors of cost-effectiveness in current programs.

However, a study in Thailand found the cost per malaria case prevented of DDT spraying (US$1.87) to be 21% greater than the cost per case prevented of lambda-cyhalothrin–treated nets (US$1.54), casting some doubt on the assumption that DDT was the most cost-effective measure. The director of Mexico's malaria control program found similar results, declaring that it was 25% cheaper for Mexico to spray a house with synthetic pyrethroids than with DDT. However, another study in South Africa found generally lower costs for DDT spraying than for impregnated nets.

A more comprehensive approach to measuring the cost-effectiveness or efficacy of malarial control would not only measure the cost in dollars, as well as the number of people saved, but would also consider ecological damage and negative human health impacts. One preliminary study found that it is likely that the detriment to human health approaches or exceeds the beneficial reductions in malarial cases, except perhaps in epidemics. It is similar to the earlier study regarding estimated theoretical infant mortality caused by DDT and subject to the criticism also mentioned earlier.

A study in the Solomon Islands found that "although impregnated bed nets cannot entirely replace DDT spraying without substantial increase in incidence, their use permits reduced DDT spraying".

A comparison of four successful programs against malaria in Brazil, India, Eritrea and Vietnam does not endorse any single strategy but instead states, "Common success factors included conducive country conditions, a targeted technical approach using a package of effective tools, data-driven decision-making, active leadership at all levels of government, involvement of communities, decentralized implementation and control of finances, skilled technical and managerial capacity at national and sub-national levels, hands-on technical and programmatic support from partner agencies, and sufficient and flexible financing."

DDT resistant mosquitoes may be susceptible to pyrethroids in some countries. However, pyrethroid resistance in Anopheles mosquitoes is on the rise with resistant mosquitoes found in multiple countries.

== See also ==
- DDT in New Zealand
- Operation Cat Drop
- Environmental hazard
- Index of pesticide articles
  - Pest control
  - Pesticide
  - Pesticide residue
  - Pesticide standard value
  - WHO Pesticide Evaluation Scheme
- Mosquito control
