= Chlorocarbonylsulfenyl chloride =

Identifiers
CAS Number	2757-23-5
3D model (JSmol)	Interactive image
ChemSpider	68489
EC Number	220-415-2
PubChem CID	75990
CompTox Dashboard (EPA)	DTXSID10181970
- InChI: InChI=1S/CCl2OS/c2-1(4)5-3 Key: MNOALXGAYUJNKX-UHFFFAOYSA-N
- SMILES: C(=O)(SCl)Cl

Properties
Chemical formula	Cl−C(=O)−S−Cl
Molar mass	130.97 g·mol^{−1}
Appearance	colorless liquid
Density	1.552 g/cm^{3}
Boiling point	98 °C (208 °F; 371 K)

Hazards
- GHS labelling
Pictograms	(GHS05: Corrosive)
Signal word	Danger
Hazard statements	H314
Precautionary statements	P260, P264, P280, P301+P330+P331, P302+P361+P354, P304+P340, P305+P354+P338, P316, P321, P363, P405, P501
- Except where otherwise noted, data are given for materials in their standard state (at 25 °C [77 °F], 100 kPa). Infobox references

Chlorocarbonylsulfenyl chloride is the chemical compound with the formula Cl−C(=O)−S−Cl. It is a colorless, distillable liquid that is related to phosgene. It features two reactive functional groups, an acyl chloride and a sulfenyl chloride. According to X-ray crystallography, the molecule is planar.

== Preparation and reactions ==
Chlorocarbonylsulfenyl chloride is prepared by hydrolysis of trichloromethane sulfenyl chloride in sulfuric acid as solvent:

Cl_{3}C−S−Cl + H_{2}O → Cl−S−C(=O)−Cl + 2 HCl

The compound, being bifunctional, has been used for the preparation of several heterocycles including oxathiazol-2-ones, oxathialones, and oxathiazoles.

Treatment with formamides gives dithiazolidinediones (also known as dithiasuccinoyl, or DTS).

Relevant to amino acid chemistry, ethylthionocarbamates react with chlorocarbonylsulfenyl chloride to give DTS derivatives:

Cl−S−C(=O)−Cl + CH_{3}CH_{2}−O−C(=S)−NH−R → S_{2}(CO)_{2}NR + HCl + CH_{3}CH_{2}Cl

Alcohols and amines react at the acyl chloride position to form alkoxycarbonylsulfenyl chlorides and carbamoylsulfenyl chlorides. Thiols selectively react at the sulfenyl chloride position to form S-alkylchlorocarbonyl disulfides:

ROH + Cl–S–C(=O)–Cl → Cl–S–C(=O)–OR + HCl

RNH_{2} + Cl–S–C(=O)–Cl → Cl–S–C(=O)–NHR + HCl

RSH + Cl–S–C(=O)–Cl → RS–S–C(=O)–Cl + HCl

These reagents are useful for the derivatization of biological thiols. Methoxycarbonylsulfenyl chloride, a related reagent derived from the above chemistry, is used in solid-phase peptide synthesis for selective disulfide bond formation via conversion of the acetamidomethyl (Acm) cysteine protecting group to thiol-labile S-alkylsulfenyl thiocarbonate (carbomethylsulfenyl, Scm) protecting group.
