= Sulfenyl chloride =

Chemical group (R–S–Cl)

General structural formula of sulfenyl chlorides, RSCl

In organosulfur chemistry, a sulfenyl chloride is a functional group with the connectivity R−S−Cl, where R is alkyl or aryl. Sulfenyl chlorides are reactive compounds that behave as sources of RS^{+}. They are used in the formation of RS−N and RS−O bonds. According to IUPAC nomenclature they are named as alkyl thiohypochlorites, i.e. esters of thiohypochlorous acid.

Typically, sulfenyl halides are stabilized by electronegative substituents. This trend is illustrated by the stability of CCl_{3}SCl obtained by chlorination of carbon disulfide.

== Preparation ==
Trichloromethanesulfenyl chloride is a stable sulfenyl chloride

Sulfenyl chlorides are typically prepared by chlorination of disulfides:

R_{2}S_{2} + Cl_{2} → 2 R−SCl

This reaction is sometimes called the Zincke disulfide reaction, in recognition of Theodor Zincke.

Some thioethers (R−S−R’) with electron-withdrawing substituents undergo chlorinolysis of a C−S bond to afford the sulfenyl chloride.

== Reactions ==
Perchloromethyl mercaptan (CCl_{3}SCl) reacts with NH-containing amines in the presence of base to give the sulfenamides:

CCl_{3}SCl + R_{2}NH → CCl_{3}SNR_{2} + HCl

This method is used in the production of the fungicides Captan and Folpet.

Sulfenyl chlorides add across alkenes, for example cyclohexene and ethylene

CH_{2}=CH_{2} + R−SCl → R−SC_{2}H_{4}Cl

They undergo chlorination to the trichlorides:

R−SCl + Cl_{2} → [R−SCl_{2}]Cl

Sulfenyl chlorides react with water and alcohols to give sulfenyl esters (R−S−O−R′):

R−SCl + H_{2}O → R−SOH + HCl
R−SCl + R'−OH → R−SO−R' + HCl

Sulfenyl chlorides react with thiols to form disulfides. Various acyl sulfenyl chlorides may thus be used to form acylated disulfides. A representative example is methoxycarbonylsulfenyl chloride:

R–SH + Cl–S–C(=O)–OMe → R–S–S–C(=O)–OMe + HCl

=== Route to sulfinyl halides ===
Sulfenyl chlorides can be converted to sulfinyl chlorides (RS(O)Cl). In one approach, the sulfinyl chloride is generated in two steps starting with reaction of a thiol (−SH) with sulfuryl chloride (SO_{2}Cl_{2}). In some cases the sulfenyl chloride results instead, as happens with 2,2,2-trifluoro-1,1-diphenylethanethiol. A trifluoroperacetic acid oxidation then provides a general approach to formation of sulfinyl chlorides from sulfenyl chlorides:

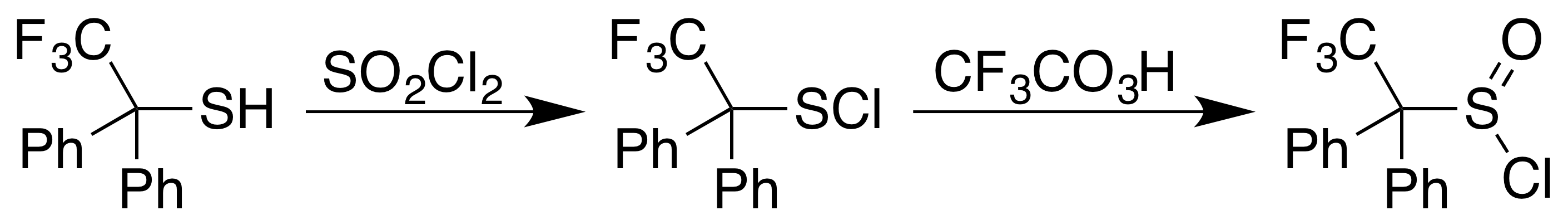

== Related compounds ==
Sulfenyl fluorides and bromides are also known. The corresponding selenenyl halides, e.g. R−SeCl, are more commonly encountered in the laboratory.

Simple sulfenyl iodides are unstable with respect to the disulfide and iodine, gradually decomposing over the course of several hours at low temperature:

2 R−SI → (R−S)_{2} + I_{2}

They can be formed metastably from metal mercaptides and iodine, and even form fleetingly when iodine oxidizes neutral thiols to the disulfide. Indeed, sulfenyl iodides are believed to be the active iodinating agents in iodotyrosine biosynthesis. Sulfenyl iodides that are heavily sterically hindered from dimerization are stable.

A related class of compounds are the alkylsulfur trichlorides, as exemplified by methylsulfur trichloride, CH_{3}SCl_{3}.

== Applications ==
Sulfenyl chlorides are used in the production of agents used in the vulcanization of rubber.
