= Sunhigh (peach) =

Peach cultivar

- Species: Prunus persica
- Breeder: M. A. Blake
- Origin: New Brunswick, New Jersey

The "Sunhigh" is a yellow-fleshed peach cultivar cultivated in 1938 by the New Jersey Agricultural Experiment Station (NJAES) at Rutgers University. The fruit is sized at 2.5 to 3 inches (6 to 8 cm) with 75-100% of maximum red color, and its storage temperatures range from 32 to 40 °F (0 to 4 °C).

== Cultivation ==
The peach cultivar is exposed to Rhizopus nest rots if left untreated, and usage of captan caused 63% of the peaches to cause decay. A 1969 study notices size differences caused by irrigation.
