= Indoor residual spraying =

Process of spraying insecticides inside residences to prevent malaria

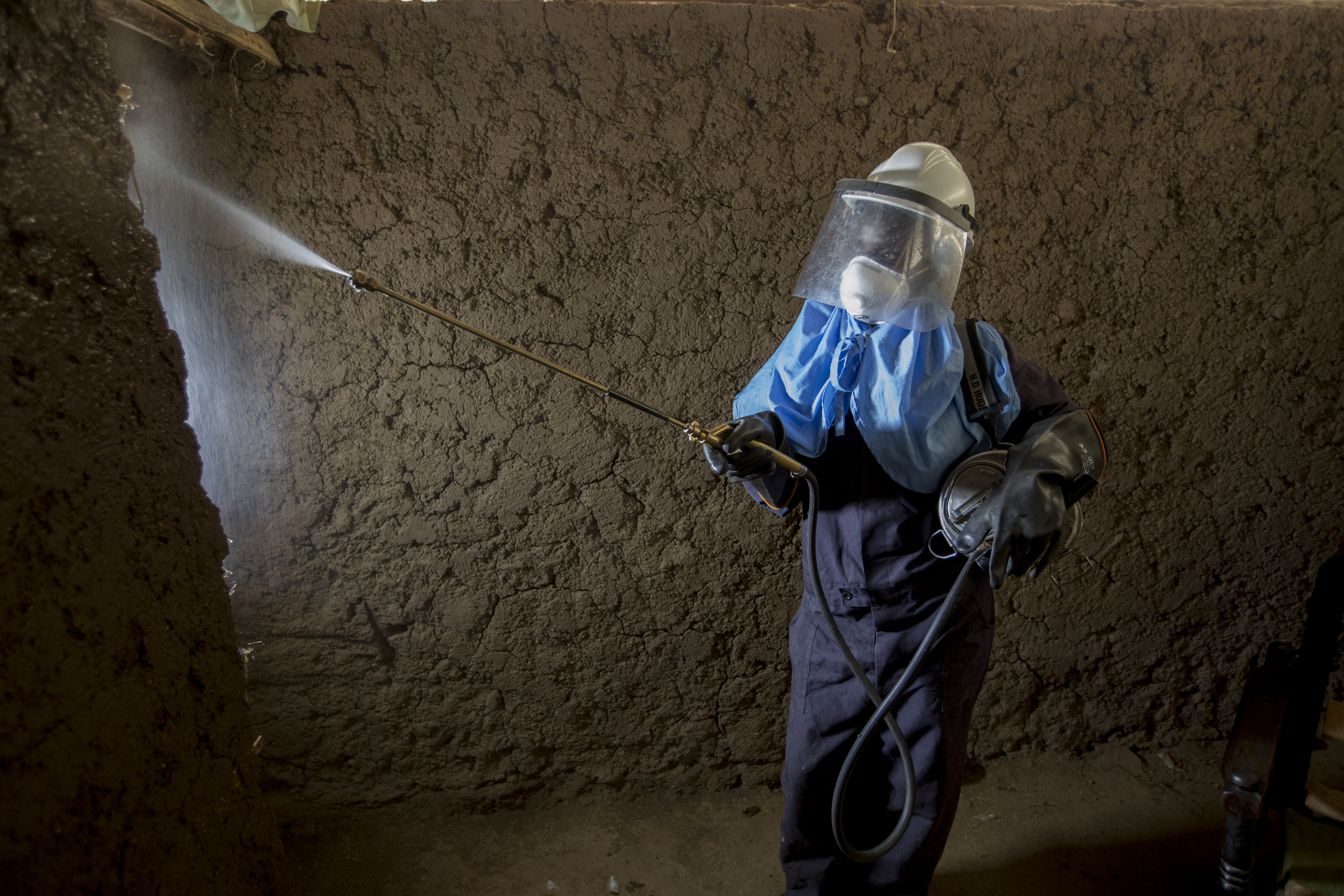
Indoor residual spraying in Kenya in 2017

Indoor residual spraying or IRS is the process of spraying the inside of dwellings with an insecticide to kill mosquitoes that spread malaria. A dilute solution of insecticide is sprayed on the inside walls of certain types of dwellings—those with walls made from porous materials such as mud or wood but not plaster as in city dwellings. Mosquitoes are killed or repelled by the spray, preventing the transmission of the disease. In 2008, 44 countries employed the IRS as a malaria control strategy. Several pesticides have historically been used for IRS, the first and most well-known being DDT.

== World Health Organization recommendations ==
The World Health Organization (WHO) recommends IRS as one of three primary means of malaria control, the others being use of insecticide treated bednets (ITNs) and prompt treatment of confirmed cases with artemisinin-based combination therapies (ACTs). While previously the WHO had recommended IRS only in areas of sporadic malaria transmission, in 2006 it began recommending IRS in areas of endemic, stable transmission as well.

According to the WHO:

[N]ational governments should:

1. Introduce and/or scale up coverage of targeted IRS as a primary malaria control intervention in countries where available data indicates that it can be effective towards achieving malaria targets.
2. Take all necessary steps to ensure effective implementation of IRS interventions, including selecting the appropriate insecticide, spraying where and when necessary and sustaining a high level of coverage, and to prevent unauthorized or un-recommended use of public health insecticides.
3. Strengthen the managerial capacity of national malaria control programmes and improve human, technical and financial resources for the timely delivery and high coverage of effective interventions including IRS, with adequate monitoring and evaluation.

Furthermore, for IRS to be effective:

1. There must be a high percentage of sprayable surfaces within each dwelling.
2. The vector (mosquitos) must feed or rest indoors.
3. The targeted vectors must be susceptible (i.e. not resistant) to the insecticide being sprayed.

The WHO further states that "insecticide susceptibility and vector behaviour; safety for humans and the environment; and efficacy and cost-effectiveness" are factors that must be considered when selecting an insecticide for IRS.

=== Approved insecticides ===
Currently, the WHO has approved 13 different insecticides for the IRS.

Insecticide	Class	Recommended dosage of active ingredient (g/m^{2})	Duration of effective action (months)	Estimated cost per house per 6 months (US$) (Note: "Excluding operational costs and freight and other external costs")	WHO toxicity rating (Note: Ia = Extremely Hazardous; Ib = Highly Hazardous; II = Moderately Hazardous; III = Slightly Hazardous; U = Unlikely To Be Hazardous.)
DDT	Organochlorine	1–2	>6	1.60	II
Fenitrothion	Organophosphate	2	3–6	14.80	II
Malathion	Organophosphate	2	2–3	8.20	III
Pirimiphos-methyl	Organophosphate	1–2	2–3		III
Propoxur	Carbamate	1–2	3–6	18.80	II
Bendiocarb	Carbamate	0.1–0.4	2–6	13.80	II
Alpha-cypermethrin	Pyrethroid	0.02–0.03	4–6		II
Cyfluthrin	Pyrethroid	0.02–0.05	3–6		II
Deltamethrin	Pyrethroid	0.02–0.025	3–6	1.60	II
Etofenprox	Pyrethroid	0.1–0.3	3–6		U
Lambda-cyhalothrin	Pyrethroid	0.02–0.03	3–6	8.60	III
Bifenthrin	Pyrethroid	0.025–0.05	3–6		II
Clothianidin	Neonicotinoid				

== Cost effectiveness and efficacy ==
According to 2010 Cochrane review, IRS is an effective strategy for reducing malaria incidence. It is about as effective as using insecticide treated nets (ITN)s, though ITNs may be more effective at reducing morbidity in some situations.

Few studies have directly compared the cost effectiveness of IRS directly with other methods of malaria control. A study from 2008 assessed the cost effectiveness of seven African anti-malaria campaigns: two IRS campaigns and five insecticide treated bednet (ITN) distribution campaigns. The authors found that on a cost-per-child-death-averted basis, all were about the same, but the ITN campaigns were slightly more cost effective.

With regard to the cost effectiveness of various pesticides vis-a-vis each other for IRS, historically DDT has been considered the most cost effective, mainly because it lasts longer than alternatives and therefore dwellings can be sprayed less frequently. But actual studies on cost effectiveness are lacking, and none have taken into account the adverse health and environmental effects of DDT or its alternatives. The United Nations Environment Programme (UNEP) concluded in 2008 that "IRS with DDT remains affordable and effective in many situations but, with regard to the direct costs, the relative advantage of DDT vis-à-vis alternative insecticides seems to be diminishing. The contextual evidence base on cost-effectiveness needs strengthening, and the external costs of DDT use vis-à-vis alternative insecticides require a careful assessment."

== Residents' opposition to IRS ==
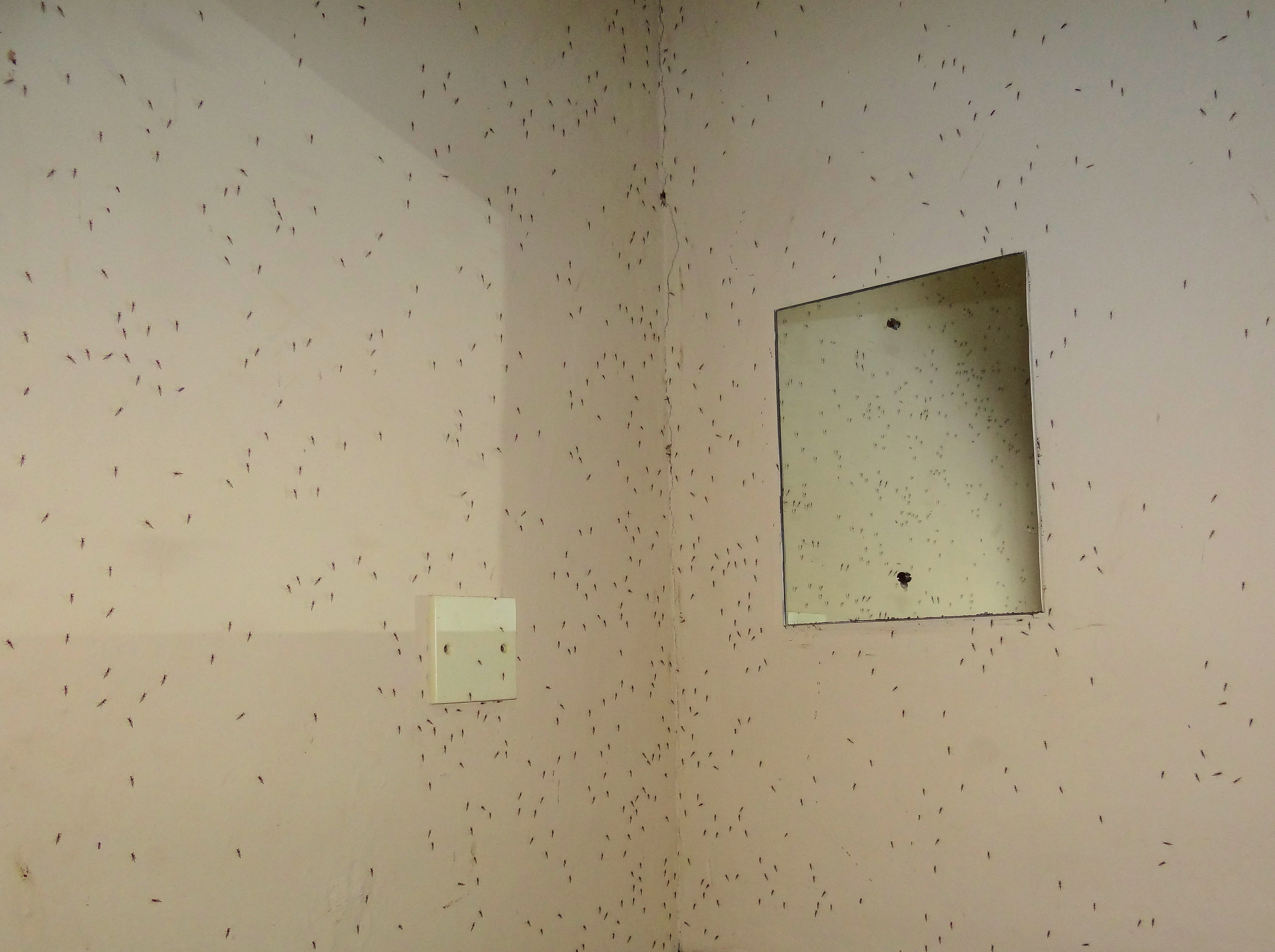
Mosquitos on the walls on IRS-treated bathroom on the shores of Lake Victoria. The mosquitoes remain on the wall until they fall down dead on the floor.

For IRS to be effective, at least 80% of premises (houses and animal shelters) in an area must be sprayed, and if enough residents refuse spraying, the effectiveness of the whole program can be jeopardized. Many residents resist spraying of DDT in particular. This is due to a variety of factors, including its smell and the stains it leaves on the walls. While that stain makes it easier to check whether the room has been sprayed, it causes some villagers to resist the spraying of their homes or to resurface the wall, which eliminates the residual insecticidal effect. Pyrethroid insecticides are reportedly more acceptable since they do not leave visible residues on the walls.

In addition, DDT is not suitable for this type of spraying in Western-style plastered or painted walls, only traditional dwellings with unpainted walls made of mud, sticks, dung, thatch, clay, or cement. As rural areas of South Africa become more prosperous, there is a shift towards Western style housing, leaving fewer homes suitable for DDT spraying, and necessitating the use of alternative insecticides.

Other villagers object to DDT spraying because it does not kill cockroaches or bedbugs; rather, it excites such pests making them more active, so that often the use of another insecticide is additionally required. Pyrethroids such as deltamethrin and lambdacyhalothrin, on the other hand, are more acceptable to residents because they kill these nuisance insects as well as mosquitoes. DDT has also been known to kill beneficial insects, such as wasps that kill caterpillars that, unchecked, destroy thatched roofs.

As a result, Mozambique's chief of infectious disease control, Avertino Barreto, says that resistance to DDT spraying is "homegrown", not due to "pressure from environmentalists". "They only want us to use DDT on poor, rural black people," he says. "So whoever suggests DDT use, I say, 'Fine, I'll start spraying in your house first.'"

== Use of DDT ==
As discussed above, DDT is one of several insecticides currently approved by the WHO for use in malaria control. The following table shows recent per country use of DDT for IRS. Unless otherwise noted, data for 2003–2007 is from the 2008 Stockholm Convention/UNEP monograph on the current status of DDT, 2008 data is from the WHO's World Malaria Report 2009, and 2009 data is from the 2010 report of the Stockholm Convention's DDT expert group. The World Malaria Report 2009 does not report the amount of DDT used in each country, only whether it is used or not. Accordingly, countries are listed as using 0 or "some" DDT. Use statistics for 2009–2011 are available from a report of Stockholm Convention's DDT Export Group

Country	2003 use (tonnes)	2005 use (tonnes)	2007 use (tonnes)	2008 use	2009 use (tonnes)	Notes
Botswana	0	0	0	0		Use suspended in 1997, plans to introduce in 2009
Cameroon	0	0	0	0		plan to introduce in 2009
China	0	0	n.a.	0	0	discontinued use in 2003
DR Congo	0	0	0	some		plan to reintroduce
Eritrea	13	15	15	some		
Ethiopia	272	398	371	some	1350	Spraying stopped in 2010 because of resistance
Gambia	0	0	0	0	some	plan to introduce in 2008
Guyana	n.a.	n.a.	n.a.	some		listed in World Malaria Report 2013 as not using DDT for IRS
India	4444	4253	3188	some	3415	includes use for both malaria and leishmaniasis
Madagascar	45	0	0	0	0	plan to reintroduce in 2009
Malawi	0	0	0	0		plan to introduce in 2009
Mauritius	1	1	0	0		some
Morocco	1	1	n.a.	0	0	
Mozambique	0	308	n.a.	some	reintroduced in 2005	
Myanmar	1	1	n.a.	some	0	phasing out
Namibia	40	40	40		some	
North Korea	n.a.	n.a.	5	some	some	(an additional 155 tonnes is used in agriculture)
Papua New Guinea	n.a.	n.a.	n.a.	some		unknown amounts used
South Africa	54	62	66	some		reintroduced in 2000
Sudan	75	n.a.	0	0		
Swaziland	n.a.	8	8	some		
Uganda	0	0	0	some		IRS with DDT was briefly implemented in 2008
Zambia	7	26	22	some	some	reintroduced in 2000
Zimbabwe	0	108	12	some		reintroduced in 2004
Global Total	4953	5219	3725		4783	2009 use includes only India, Ethiopia, Zambia, and Mauritius
