= Pesticide standard value =

Pesticide standard values are applied worldwide to control pesticide pollution, since pesticides are largely applied in numerous agricultural, commercial, residential, and industrial applications. Usually, pesticide standard value is regulated in residential surface soil (i.e., pesticide soil regulatory guidance value, or RGV), drinking water (i.e., pesticide drinking water maximum concentration level, or MCL), foods (i.e., pesticide food maximum residue level, or MRL), and other ecological sections (e.g., air, surface water, groundwater, bed sediment, or aquatic organisms).

== Definition ==
Pesticide standard values specify the maximum amount of a pollutant that may be present without prompting some form of regulatory response such as human health and ecological effects. Pesticide standard values are often derived from laboratory toxicology data (i.e., animal tests), human or ecological parameters (i.e., body weight, intake rate, lifetime, etc.), and human health risk models such as USEPA and RIVM models. On the other hand, the European Union took a precautionary approach (in accordance with the principles of its environmental policy) before toxicological data was available and provided very strict and protective standards for all pesticides in drinking water.

== Worldwide pesticide standard values ==
Up till now (November 2017), less than 30% of the worldwide nations have regulated pesticide standard values in surface residential soil, about 50% of the total nations have provided pesticide standard values in drinking water and agricultural foods. Many nations in Africa, Asia, and South America are lacking pesticide standard values for the major human and ecological exposure pathways such as soil, sediment, and water.

Pesticide standard values for many current and historical largely used pesticides such as DDT, aldrin, lindane, glyphosate, MCPA, chlorpyrifos, and 2,4-D often vary over seven, eight, or nine orders of magnitude and are log-normally distributed, which indicates that there is little agreement on the regulation of pesticide standard values among worldwide jurisdictions. Additionally, many worldwide pesticide standard values are not sufficiently low to protect public health based on human health risk uncertainty bounds calculations and maximum legal contribution estimations.

== See also ==
- Persistent organic pollutant
- Aquatic toxicology
- Regulation of pesticides in the European Union
- Pesticide regulation in the United States
