= Trichloromethane sulfenyl chloride =

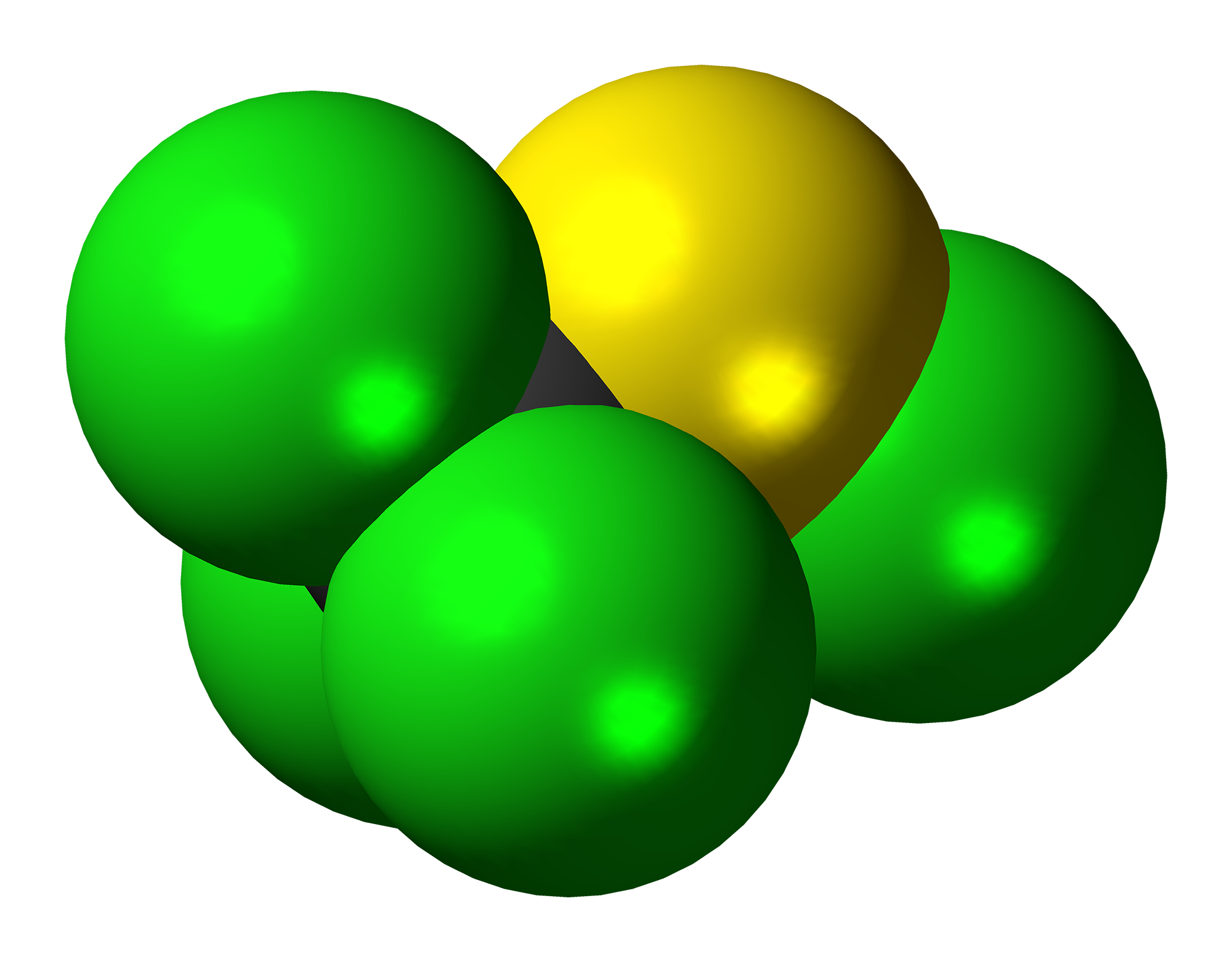

Names
- Preferred IUPAC name Trichloromethyl thiohypochlorite
- Other names: Trichloromethane sulfenyl chloride; Trichloromethyl sulfur chloride; Clairsit; Perchloromethyl mercaptan

Identifiers
CAS Number	594-42-3
3D model (JSmol)	Interactive image
ChEMBL	ChEMBL3188766
ChemSpider	11176
ECHA InfoCard	100.008.948
EC Number	209-840-4
PubChem CID	11666
RTECS number	PB0370000
UNII	KK489OII9M
UN number	1670
CompTox Dashboard (EPA)	DTXSID6025854
- InChI: InChI=1S/CCl4S/c2-1(3,4)6-5 Key: RYFZYYUIAZYQLC-UHFFFAOYSA-N; InChI=1S/CCl4S/c2-1(3,4)6-5
- SMILES: ClC(Cl)(Cl)SCl

Properties
Chemical formula	Cl_{3}C−S−Cl
Molar mass	185.87 g·mol^{−1}
Appearance	Oily, colorless liquid
Odor	disagreeable, acrid odor
Density	1.72 g/cm^{3}
Melting point	−44 °C (−47 °F; 229 K)
Boiling point	147 to 148 °C (297 to 298 °F; 420 to 421 K)
Solubility in water	Insoluble, reacts
log P	3.47 (estimated)
Vapor pressure	0.4 kPa (at 20 °C)

Hazards
- GHS labelling
Pictograms	(GHS05: Corrosive) (GHS06: Toxic) (GHS07: Exclamation mark)
Signal word	Danger
Hazard statements	H301, H311, H312, H314, H330, H335
Precautionary statements	P260, P264, P270, P271, P280, P284, P301+P310, P301+P330+P331, P302+P352, P303+P361+P353, P304+P340, P305+P351+P338, P310, P312, P320, P321, P330, P361, P363, P403+P233, P405, P501
NFPA 704 (fire diamond)	3 0 2
- Lethal dose or concentration (LD, LC)
LD_{50} (median dose)	82.6 mg/kg (rat, oral)
LC_{50} (median concentration)	11 ppm (rat, 1 hr); 16 ppm (rat, 1 hr); 9 ppm (mouse, 3 hr); 38 ppm (mouse, 2 hr); 11 ppm (rat, 1 hr)
LC_{Lo} (lowest published)	388 ppm (human, 10 min); 46 ppm (mouse, 10 min)
- NIOSH (US health exposure limits)
PEL (Permissible)	TWA 0.1 ppm (0.8 mg/m^{3})
REL (Recommended)	TWA 0.1 ppm (0.8 mg/m^{3})
IDLH (Immediate danger)	10 ppm
- Except where otherwise noted, data are given for materials in their standard state (at 25 °C [77 °F], 100 kPa). verify (what is ?) Infobox references

Trichloromethane sulfenyl chloride or perchloromethyl mercaptan is the organosulfur compound with the formula Cl_{3}C−S−Cl. It is mainly used as an intermediate for the synthesis of dyes and fungicides (captan, folpet). It is a colorless oil, although commercial samples are yellowish. It is insoluble in water but soluble in organic solvents. It has a foul, acrid odor. Perchloromethyl mercaptan is a common name. The systematic name is trichloromethanesulfenyl chloride, because the compound is a sulfenyl chloride, not a mercaptan.

== History ==
It was used as a chemical warfare agent by the French in the 1915 battle of Champagne. Shortly thereafter, wartime use was abandoned due to the clear warning properties, the decomposition in the presence of iron and steel, and the easy removal of the vapor by charcoal.

== Preparation ==
The method to prepare perchloromethyl mercaptan was first described by Rathke in 1873 and is still used. Carbon disulfide is chlorinated using an iodine catalyst. The following equations operate most efficiently at temperatures below about 30 °C

CS_{2} + 3 Cl_{2} → CCl_{3}SCl + SCl_{2}

2 CS_{2} + 5 Cl_{2} → 2 CCl_{3}SCl + S_{2}Cl_{2}

At higher temperatures, the chlorination gives carbon tetrachloride and additional sulfur chlorides. The formation of byproducts can be suppressed by performing the reaction in the presence of diketones. Another byproduct is thiophosgene. The more volatile byproducts such as carbon tetrachloride and sulfur dichloride can be removed by distillation. The separation of perchloromethyl mercaptan from S_{2}Cl_{2} by distillation is challenging since their boiling points are very close. Another byproduct that forms is hexachloroethane. Innovations in the basic Rathke method have been reported.

== Reactivity ==
The compound slowly hydrolyzes:

8 Cl_{3}C−S−Cl + 16 H_{2}O → 8 CO_{2} + 32 HCl + S_{8}

Controlled hydrolysis affords chlorocarbonylsulfenyl chloride:

Cl_{3}C−S−Cl + H_{2}O → Cl−S−C(=O)−Cl + 2 HCl

Perchloromethyl mercaptan is corrosive to most metals. It reacts with iron, evolving carbon tetrachloride. Perchloromethyl mercaptan is oxidized by nitric acid to trichloromethanesulfonyl chloride (Cl_{3}C−S(=O)_{2}−Cl), a white solid.

== Toxicity ==
Animal	Oral	Inhalation	Intraperitoneal	Intravenous	Skin	Eyes
Rat	82.6 mg/kg	11 ppm/1h	25 mg/kg			
Mouse	40 mg/kg	296 g/m^{3}/2h	10 mg/kg	56 mg/kg		
Rabbit					1410 mg/kg	
Guinea Pig					500 μL/kg	50 μg/24h

When it is heated or in a fire, it will emit toxic and corrosive gases. It is also very toxic by inhalation or skin absorption.

At least two mechanisms could account for the toxicity of perchloromethyl mercaptan, as hypothesized by Althoff (1973). The first mechanism is a reaction between perchloromethyl mercaptan and biological functional groups such as hydroxyl, sulfhydryl, amino and carboxyl groups. This results in an inactivation of key enzymes. A second general pathway reaction is the hydrolysis to give hydrochloric acid.
