= Dichlorodiphenyldichloroethylene =

- Dichlorodiphenyldichloroethylene

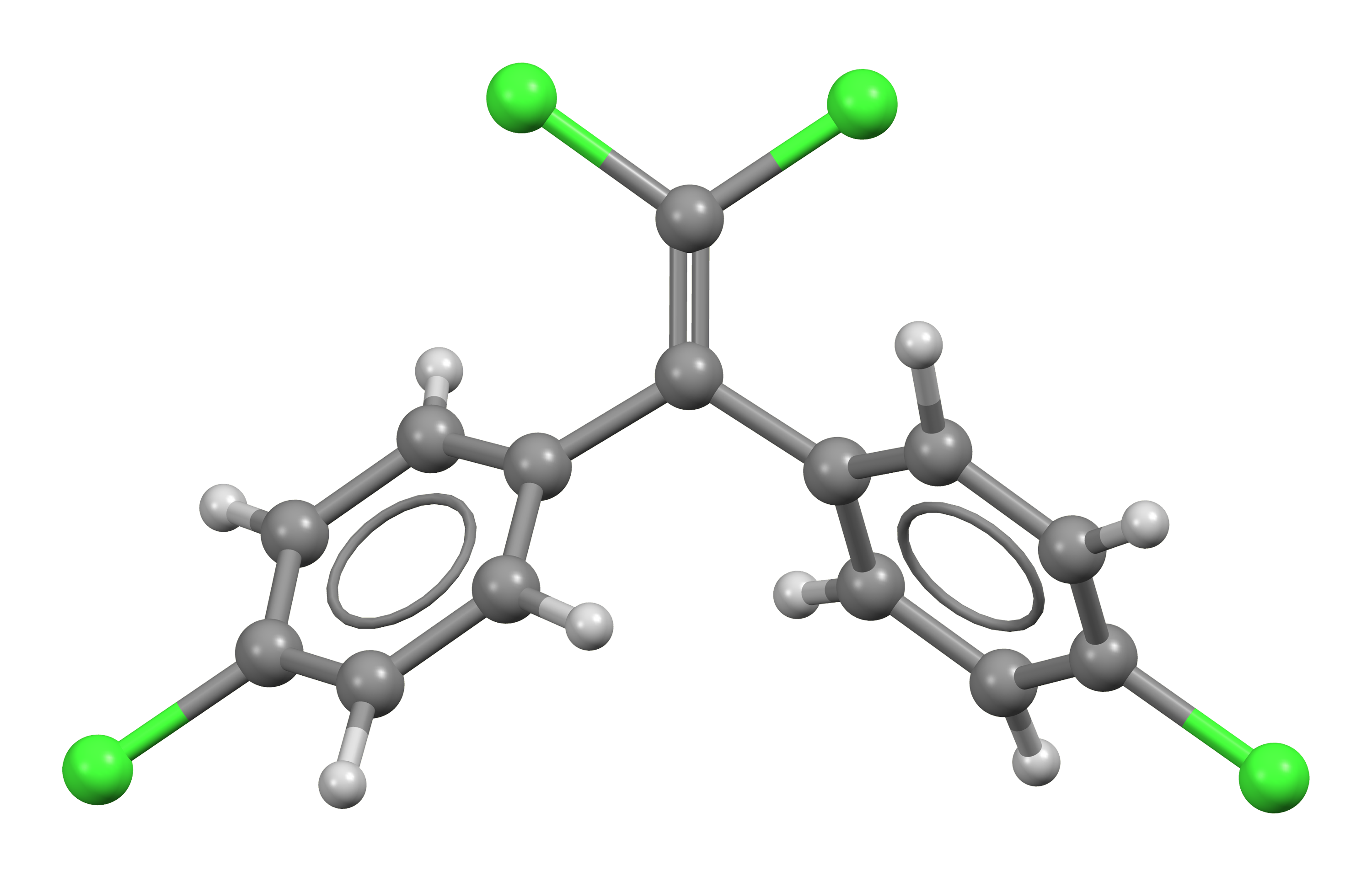
- Dichlorodiphenyldichloroethylene

Names
- Preferred IUPAC name 1,1′-(2,2-Dichloroethene-1,1-diyl)bis(4-chlorobenzene)
- Other names: Dichlorodiphenyldichloroethylene; 1,1-Dichloro-2,2-bis(4-chlorophenyl)ethene

Identifiers
CAS Number	72-55-9
3D model (JSmol)	Interactive image
Abbreviations	p,p'-DDE
ChEBI	CHEBI:16598
ChEMBL	ChEMBL363207
ChemSpider	2927
ECHA InfoCard	100.000.713
KEGG	C04596
PubChem CID	3035
UNII	4M7FS82U08
CompTox Dashboard (EPA)	DTXSID9020374
- InChI: InChI=1S/C14H8Cl4/c15-11-5-1-9(2-6-11)13(14(17)18)10-3-7-12(16)8-4-10/h1-8H Key: UCNVFOCBFJOQAL-UHFFFAOYSA-N; InChI=1/C14H8Cl4/c15-11-5-1-9(2-6-11)13(14(17)18)10-3-7-12(16)8-4-10/h1-8H Key: UCNVFOCBFJOQAL-UHFFFAOYAE
- SMILES: Clc2ccc(\C(=C(/Cl)Cl)c1ccc(Cl)cc1)cc2

Properties
Chemical formula	C_{14}H_{8}Cl_{4}
Molar mass	318.02 g·mol^{−1}
- Except where otherwise noted, data are given for materials in their standard state (at 25 °C [77 °F], 100 kPa). verify (what is ?) Infobox references

Dichlorodiphenyldichloroethylene (DDE) is a chemical compound formed by the loss of hydrogen chloride (dehydrohalogenation) from DDT, of which it is one of the more common breakdown products. Due to DDT's massive prevalence in society and agriculture during the mid 20th century, DDT and DDE are still widely seen in animal tissue samples, and human blood. DDE is particularly dangerous because it is fat-soluble like other organochlorines; thus, it is rarely excreted from the body, and concentrations tend to increase throughout life. The major exception is the excretion of DDE in breast milk, which transfers a substantial portion of the mother's DDE burden to the young animal or child. Along with accumulation over an organism's lifetime, this stability leads to bioaccumulation in the environment, which amplifies DDE's negative effects.

== Synthesis ==
DDE is created by dehydrohalogenation of DDT. The loss of HCl results in a double bond on the central (previously quaternary) carbon atoms.

Degradation of DDT to form DDE by an elimination of HCl

== Toxicity ==
DDE has been shown to be toxic to rats at 79.6 mg/kg. DDE and its parent, DDT, are reproductive toxicants for certain birds species, and major reasons for the decline of the bald eagle, brown pelican peregrine falcon, and osprey. These compounds cause egg shell thinning in susceptible species, which leads to the birds' crushing their eggs instead of incubating them, due to the latter's lack of resistance. Birds of prey, waterfowl, and song birds are more susceptible to eggshell thinning than chickens and related species, and DDE appears to be more potent than DDT.

Research shows that an elevated blood levels of DDEs (also of other toxic molecule from nonstick cookware, and fire retardants) have been tied to an increased risk for celiac disease in young people. DDE has also been shown to be present in increased concentrations in the tumors of patients with primary hyperparathyroidism.

== Mechanism ==
The biological mechanism for the thinning is not entirely known, but it is believed that p,p'-DDE impairs the hen's gland's ability to excrete calcium carbonate onto the developing egg. Multiple mechanisms may be at work, or different mechanisms may operate in different species. Some studies have shown that although DDE levels have fallen dramatically, eggshell thickness remains 10–12 percent thinner than before DDT was first used.

Some studies have indicated that DDE is an endocrine disruptor. However, human exposure to DDE is not associated with breast cancer. What is more clear is that DDE is a weak androgen receptor antagonist and can produce male genital tract abnormalities.

== See also ==
- Insecticide
