= 1,2,4-Dithiazolidine-3,5-dione =

Names
- Preferred IUPAC name 1,2,4-Dithiazolidine-3,5-dione

Identifiers
CAS Number	35371-97-2
3D model (JSmol)	Interactive image
ChemSpider	378631
PubChem CID	428002
CompTox Dashboard (EPA)	DTXSID50330228
- InChI: InChI=1S/C2HNO2S2/c4-1-3-2(5)7-6-1/h(H,3,4,5) Key: BPVALDZRWMHTCJ-UHFFFAOYSA-N
- SMILES: C1(=O)NC(=O)SS1

Properties
Chemical formula	C_{2}HNO_{2}S_{2}
Molar mass	135.16 g·mol^{−1}
Appearance	white solid
Density	1.880 g/cm^{3}
Melting point	141–143 °C (286–289 °F; 414–416 K)
- Except where otherwise noted, data are given for materials in their standard state (at 25 °C [77 °F], 100 kPa). Infobox references

1,2,4-Dithiazolidine-3,5-dione (DTS) is the heterocyclic compound with the formula S_{2}(CO)_{2}NH. In terms of functional groups, the molecule contains a disulfide (-S-S-) and an imido group ((RCO)_{2}NH).

The title compound is prepared by the reaction of ethyl thiocarbamate and chlorocarbonylsulfenyl chloride followed by treatment of the intermediate with hot hydrochloric acid:

2 ClSC(O)Cl + C_{2}H_{5}OC(SH)NH → S_{2}(CO)(COC_{2}H_{5})N + 2 HCl
S_{2}(CO)(COC_{2}H_{5})N + HCl → S_{2}(CO)_{2}NH + C_{2}H_{5}Cl

N-substituted derivatives can be prepared by N-alkylation:

S_{2}(CO)_{2}NH + RX + (C_{2}H_{5})_{3}N → S_{2}(CO)_{2}NR + (C_{2}H_{5})_{3}NHCl

The compound has been evaluated in several biochemical contexts including controlled release of hydrogen sulfide.
