= Othmar Zeidler =

German chemist

- Born: 29 August 1850; Vienna, Austrian Empire
- Died: 17 June 1911 (aged 60); Mauer, Austria-Hungary
- Occupations: Pharmacist, chemist
- Known for: The creation of DDT

Othmar Zeidler (29 August 1850 – 17 June 1911) (Note: Though many sources mention 1859 as Zeidler's year of birth, this would make him a mere 14 years old at the time of his dissertation in 1873. The 1859 birth year was used by Joseph S. Fruton, as well as by Gerhard Oberkofler. The latter even has him quit his pharmacy studies at the Vienna University in 1872 (at the apparent age of 12/13) to move to Strassburg. However, Ryslavy gives his year of birth as 1850; furthermore, his obituary at Österreichische Chemiker–Zeitung in 1911 states that Zeidler was 61 years at the time of his death, placing his birth around 1850 (in reality, Zeidler died 2 months shy of his 61st birthday).) was an Austrian chemist credited with the first synthesis of DDT.

== Life ==
He was born on 29 August 1850 in Vienna a son of the Viennese pharmacist Franz Zeidler. Othmar's brother, Franz Zeidler Jr. (1851–1901), also became a chemist and would collaborate with him on several projects. As a doctoral student with Adolf von Baeyer at the University of Strasbourg, then in Germany, Zeidler is credited with the first synthesis of the insecticide dichlorodiphenyltrichloroethane, or DDT in 1874. Othmar returned to Austria before 1876 and, after working at the I. chemischen Universitätslaboratorium at the University of Vienna, became a pharmacist in the Fünfhaus district of the capital. He died in Mauer near Vienna on 17 June 1911.
