= DFDT =

Chemical compound, insecticide

Difluorodiphenyltrichloroethane

Names
- Preferred IUPAC name 1,1′-(2,2,2-Trichloroethane-1,1-diyl)bis(4-fluorobenzene)
- Other names Fluorogesarol; Fluoro-DDT; p,p′-Fluoro-DDT; p,p′-Difluorodiphenyltrichloroethane

Identifiers
CAS Number	475-26-3
3D model (JSmol)	Interactive image
ChemSpider	9733
ECHA InfoCard	100.006.814
EC Number	207-493-3
PubChem CID	10139
UNII	5OLW69O0Q3
CompTox Dashboard (EPA)	DTXSID9042253
- InChI: InChI=1S/C14H9Cl3F2/c15-14(16,17)13(9-1-5-11(18)6-2-9)10-3-7-12(19)8-4-10/h1-8,13H Key: CLSXNIPAOWPLFR-UHFFFAOYSA-N
- SMILES: C1=CC(=CC=C1C(C2=CC=C(C=C2)F)C(Cl)(Cl)Cl)F

Properties
Chemical formula	C_{14}H_{9}Cl_{3}F_{2}
Molar mass	321.57 g·mol^{−1}
- Except where otherwise noted, data are given for materials in their standard state (at 25 °C [77 °F], 100 kPa). Infobox references

Difluorodiphenyltrichloroethane (DFDT) is a chemical compound. Its composition is the same as that of the insecticide DDT, except that two of DDT's chlorine atoms are replaced by two fluorine atoms.

DFDT was developed as an insecticide by German scientists during World War II. It is possible that Hoechst wanted to avoid license fees for DDT to Schering or the original developer J. R. Geigy (the later Ciba-Geigy). It was documented by Allied military intelligence, but for Americans it remained in obscurity after the war.

In 2019, New York University chemists reported that DFDT and a mono-fluorinated derivative, MFDT, might be a more effective insecticide than DDT, and might therefore be used to combat malaria with less of an environmental impact. A later study of DFDT found it to be encumbered by the same resistance as DDT while being less effective in Drosophila melanogaster, and "unlikely to be a viable public health vector control insecticide".
