= C14H10Cl4 =

The molecular formula C_{14}H_{10}Cl_{4} (molar mass: 320.04 g/mol) may refer to:

- Dichlorodiphenyldichloroethane (DDD), an organochloride insecticide
- Mitotane, an antineoplastic medication
