= Wettable powder =

Insecticide or other pesticide formulation

A wettable powder (WP) is an insecticide or other pesticide formulation consisting of the active ingredient in a finely ground state combined with wetting agents and sometimes bulking agents. Wettable powders are designed to be applied as a dilute suspension through liquid spraying equipment. As wettable powders are not mixed with water until immediately before use, storing and transporting the products may be simplified as the weight and volume of the water is avoided. Wettable powders may be supplied in bulk or in measured sachets made from water-soluble film to simplify premixing and reduce operator exposure to the product.
