= Folpet =

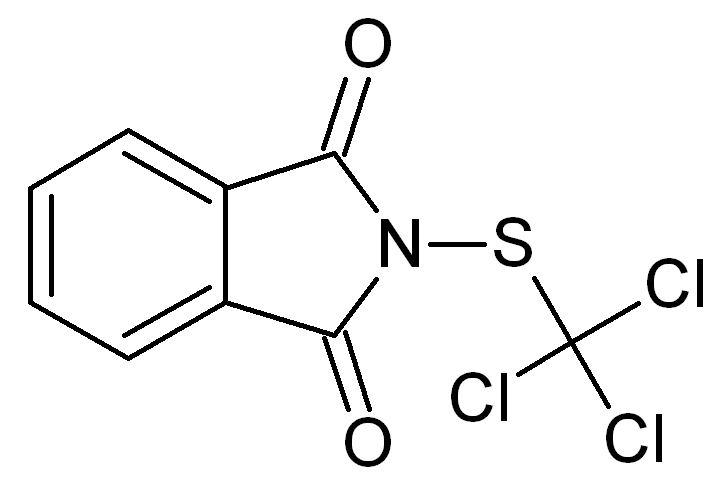

Names
- Preferred IUPAC name 2-[(trichloromethyl)sulfanyl]-1H-isoindole-1,3(2H)-dione
- Other names N-(Trichloromethylthio)phthalimide, Orthophaltan, Phaltan, Faltan, Folpan, Faltex, Folpex

Identifiers
CAS Number	133-07-3
3D model (JSmol)	Interactive image
ChEBI	CHEBI:82019
ChEMBL	ChEMBL1883819
ChemSpider	8288
ECHA InfoCard	100.004.627
EC Number	205-088-6
KEGG	C18860
PubChem CID	8607
RTECS number	TI5685000
UNII	X5NFK36917
UN number	3077 2588
CompTox Dashboard (EPA)	DTXSID0021385
- InChI: InChI=1S/C9H4Cl3NO2S/c10-9(11,12)16-13-7(14)5-3-1-2-4-6(5)8(13)15/h1-4H Key: HKIOYBQGHSTUDB-UHFFFAOYSA-N
- SMILES: C1=CC=C2C(=C1)C(=O)N(C2=O)SC(Cl)(Cl)Cl

Properties
Chemical formula	C_{9}H_{4}Cl_{3}NO_{2}S
Molar mass	296.55 g·mol^{−1}
Appearance	white solid
Density	1.72 g/cm^{3}
Melting point	177 °C (351 °F; 450 K) (decomp.)

Hazards
- GHS labelling
Pictograms	(GHS07: Exclamation mark) (GHS08: Health hazard) (GHS09: Environmental hazard)
Signal word	Warning
Hazard statements	H317, H319, H332, H351, H400
Precautionary statements	P201, P202, P261, P264, P271, P272, P273, P280, P281, P302+P352, P304+P312, P304+P340, P305+P351+P338, P308+P313, P312, P321, P333+P313, P337+P313, P363, P391, P405, P501
- Except where otherwise noted, data are given for materials in their standard state (at 25 °C [77 °F], 100 kPa). Infobox references

Folpet is the tradename for the organic compound with the formula C_{6}H_{4}(CO)_{2}NSCCl_{3}. It is a fungicide derived from phthalimide (C_{6}H_{4}(CO)_{2}N-) and trichloromethylsulfenyl chloride. The compound is white although commercial samples can appear brownish. It is structurally related to Captan, which is also a trichloromethylsulfenyl-containing fungicide.

== Resistance ==
As of December 2019 folpet resistance is still unheard of due to its multiple effects. However, in 2001 some degree of cross-resistance was reported in iprodione-resistant South African Botrytis cinerea on grape.
