= Captan =

- Captan

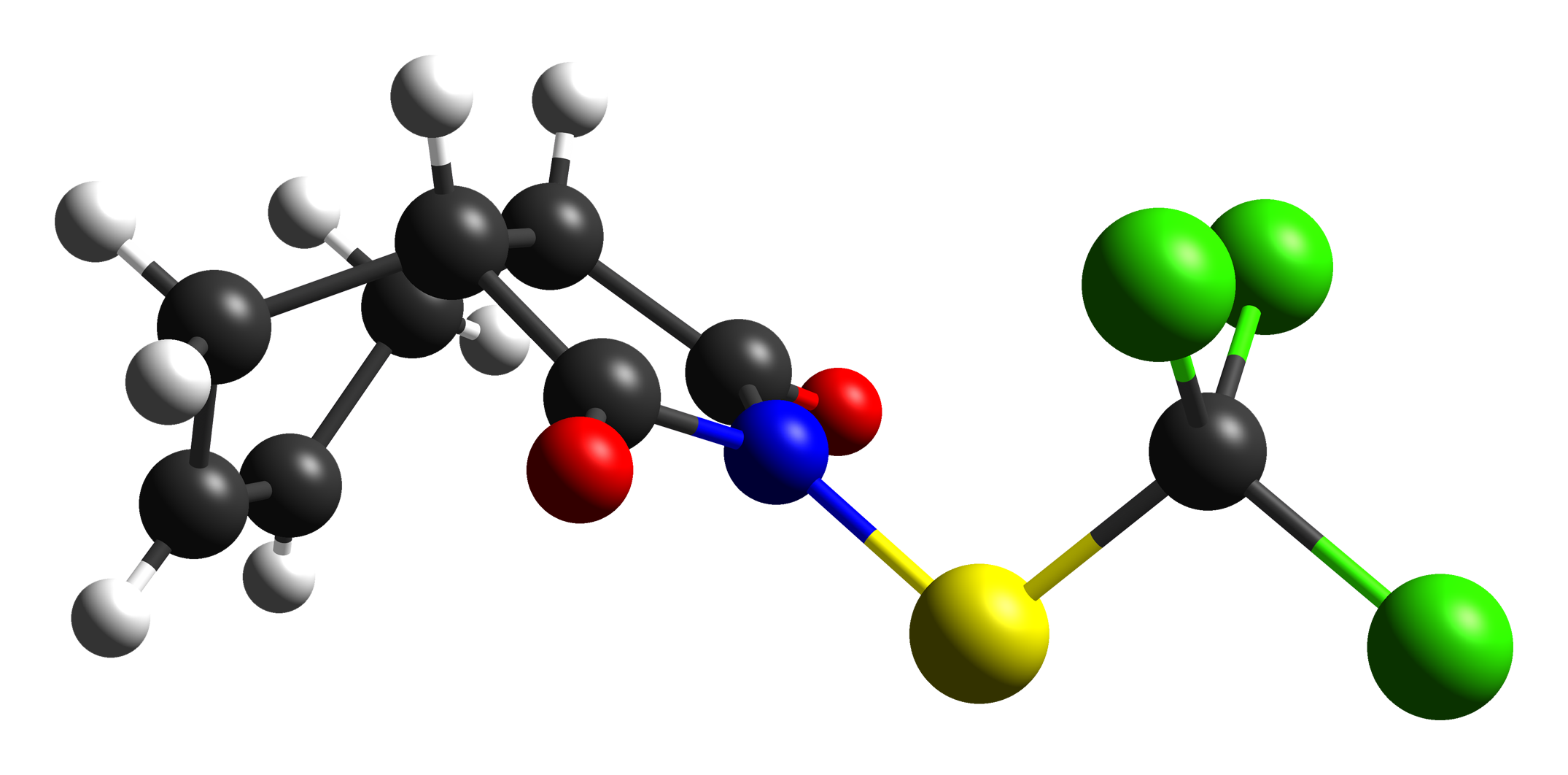

Names
- IUPAC name (3aR,7aS)-2-[(Trichloromethyl)sulfanyl]-3a,4,7,7a-tetrahydro-1H-isoindole-1,3(2H)-dione

Identifiers
CAS Number	133-06-2
3D model (JSmol)	Interactive image; Interactive image
ChEBI	CHEBI:34608
ChEMBL	ChEMBL388676
ChemSpider	8287
ECHA InfoCard	100.004.626
KEGG	C14438
PubChem CID	8606
UNII	EOL5G26Q9F
CompTox Dashboard (EPA)	DTXSID9020243
- InChI: InChI=1S/C9H8Cl3NO2S/c10-9(11,12)16-13-7(14)5-3-1-2-4-6(5)8(13)15/h1-2,5-6H,3-4H2 Key: LDVVMCZRFWMZSG-UHFFFAOYSA-N; InChI=1/C17H19ClN2O3/c18-13-7-3-4-8-14(13)19-15(21)9-10-20-16(22)11-5-1-2-6-12(11)17(20)23/h3-4,7-8,11-12H,1-2,5-6,9-10H2,(H,19,21)/t11-,12-/m1/s1 Key: PIBUBEBGJVBNLY-VXGBXAGGBJ; InChI=1/C9H8Cl3NO2S/c10-9(11,12)16-13-7(14)5-3-1-2-4-6(5)8(13)15/h1-2,5-6H,3-4H2 Key: LDVVMCZRFWMZSG-UHFFFAOYAB
- SMILES: C1C=CC[C@H]2[C@@H]1C(=O)N(C2=O)SC(Cl)(Cl)Cl; ClC(Cl)(Cl)SN1C(=O)C2C/C=C\CC2C1=O

Properties
Chemical formula	C_{9}H_{8}Cl_{3}NO_{2}S
Molar mass	300.58 g·mol^{−1}
Appearance	white solid; yellow powder (commercial)
Density	1.74 g/cm^{3}
Melting point	178 °C (352 °F; 451 K) (decomposes)
Boiling point	N/A

Hazards
- Occupational safety and health (OHS/OSH)
Main hazards	combustible, potential occupational carcinogen
- NIOSH (US health exposure limits)
PEL (Permissible)	none
REL (Recommended)	Ca TWA 5 mg/m^{3}
IDLH (Immediate danger)	N.D.
- Except where otherwise noted, data are given for materials in their standard state (at 25 °C [77 °F], 100 kPa). verify (what is ?) Infobox references

Captan is a general use pesticide (GUP) that belongs to the phthalimide class of fungicides. It is a white solid, although commercial samples appear yellow or brownish.

== Applications ==
Although it can be applied on its own, Captan is often added as a component of other pesticide mixtures. It is used to control diseases on a number of fruits and vegetables as well as ornamental plants. It also improves the outward appearance of many fruits, making them brighter and healthier-looking. Captan is utilized by both home and agricultural growers and is often applied during apple production. It is also active against certain oomycetes, such as Pythium, making it useful for controlling damping off.

== Biodegradation ==
The compound biodegrades with half life of less than 1 day in soil.

== Potential health effects ==
Captan was previously cited as Group B2, a probable human carcinogen by the US Environmental Protection Agency (EPA), but was reclassified in 2004. Since the mode of action has been established as a proliferative response (in mice only) after intestinal villi are disrupted, captan has been deemed not likely to cause tumors at doses that do not irritate the intestine. The EPA now states, "The new cancer classification considers captan to be a potential carcinogen at prolonged high doses that cause cytotoxicity and regenerative cell hyperplasia. These high doses of captan are many orders of magnitude above those likely to be consumed in the diet, or encountered by individuals in occupational or residential settings. Therefore, captan is not likely to be a human carcinogen nor pose cancer risks of concern when used in accordance with approved product labels. A similar reclassification has been made for folpet, a structurally related fungicide, which shares a common mechanism of toxicity. A key finding for captan (and folpet) is these fungicides are not mutagenic in the animal (in vivo).

== Production ==
It is the product of the reaction trichloromethylsulfenyl chloride with sodium salt of tetrahydrophthalamide, which is derived from tetrahydrophthalic anhydride.
