= Art Cooley =

American environmentalist, teacher, and expedition leader (1934–2022)

Arthur P. Cooley
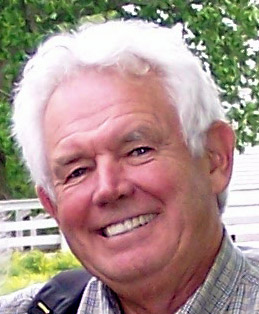
- Cooley in 2008
- Born: June 2, 1934; Southampton, New York
- Died: January 30, 2022 (aged 87); Grand Junction, Colorado
- Citizenship: American
- Education: Cornell University (B.S.; M.S.)
- Occupation(s): Educator, naturalist, scientist, environmental activist
- Employer: South Country Central School District
- Known for: Co-founding the Environmental Defense Fund
- Spouse(s): Nancy Neinstadt (m. 1954; div. 2004); Beverly Grant (m. 2004)
- Children: 2

Arthur P. Cooley (June 2, 1934 – January 30, 2022) was an American biology teacher, naturalist and expedition leader, and a co-founder of the Environmental Defense Fund (EDF).

In the mid-1960s, while a teacher at Bellport High School on New York's Long Island, Cooley was one of several local activists who came together to stop the use of the pesticide/pollutant DDT by the Suffolk County Mosquito Control Commission. This collaboration led to the founding of the Environmental Defense Fund.

== Early life ==
Cooley was born in Southampton, New York on June 2, 1934 and grew up in nearby Quogue. He earned his B.S. and M.S. degrees from Cornell University, and in 1956 joined the science faculty at Bellport High School in Brookhaven Hamlet, New York, living in East Patchogue.

== Career ==
=== Environmentalism ===
In fall of 1965, Cooley helped bring together a small group of central Long Islanders concerned with local environmental issues such as farm runoff, sewage problems, waste dumps, groundwater contamination, and his own particular interest, saltwater marsh preservation. The group included Bellport High School students, Dennis Puleston, and some of his Brookhaven National Laboratory colleagues, faculty members from Stony Brook University, and other activists. They met somewhat informally in members' living rooms, and named themselves the Brookhaven Town Natural Resources Committee (BTNRC).

Although there were no elected officers, Cooley often functioned as chairman at BTNRC get-togethers. As remembered by participant (and fellow EDF co-founder) Charles F. Wurster:

He could not only run an excellent meeting, but also had the remarkable ability to arouse people's enthusiasms about environmental topics. Someone once remarked that he could get a group of people excited about a blade of grass. Those qualities were among the secret weapons of BTNRC, and of EDF to come.

In the spring of 1966, Cooley was among the BTNRC activists who testified in favor of a class action lawsuit filed by Patchogue attorney Victor Yannacone against the Suffolk County Mosquito Control Commission, seeking to force the commission to stop using the insecticide dichlorodiphenyltrichloroethane (DDT) in the local salt marshes. Others from BTNRC who provided expert testimony included Dennis Puleston, who presented the court with his own artistic renderings of the salt marsh food chain; Charles F. Wurster, a molecular biologist who had previously helped to stop the town of Hanover, New Hampshire, from using DDT to combat Dutch elm disease; George M. Woodwell, senior ecologist of the Brookhaven National Laboratory who had published on, among other things, the persistence of DDT in forest soils; Robert E. Smolker, professor of biological sciences at Stony Brook; and ecologist and ornithologist Antony S. Taormina, Regional Director of Fish and Game of the New York State Conservation Department.

The group won a temporary injunction from the New York Supreme Court in August 1966 banning the county's use of DDT, and the Mosquito Commission switched to using the organophosphate Abate (temefos) instead. By the time the court eventually (in November 1967) ruled that it did not have jurisdiction in the case, Suffolk County had abandoned DDT.

Meanwhile, Yannacone and the BTNRC "trouble-makers" attempted in September 1967 to convince the National Audubon Society, at that year's Atlantic City convention, to establish a "legal defense fund" on behalf of the environment, and to begin a national assault on the use of DDT. The Audubon conventioneers delayed any action, so on October 6, 1967, the BTNRC activists—with a couple of new recruits from the convention—met in a conference room at Brookhaven Labs to sign the Certificate of Incorporation for the Environmental Defense Fund. The registration fee was paid by Connecticut conservationist Bob Burnap, and $10,000 was pledged by Dr. H. Lewis Batts, Jr., professor of biology at Kalamazoo College (still in town after the Audubon convention), for an EDF campaign against dieldrin back in his home state of Michigan.

Yannacone left EDF to concentrate on his own law practice in 1969. But by 1971, EDF had become a coalition of 60 lawyers, 700 scientists, and 25,000 dues-paying members. In 1972, most uses of DDT were banned by the United States federal government. Also that year, Art Cooley succeeded Dennis Puleston as Chairman of the Board of Trustees of EDF. Cooley served as chairman until 1975. He remained active in the organization, and was on its board until his death.

=== Teaching ===
Cooley taught for 33 years, and retired from Bellport in 1989. While a teacher he traveled to Scotland as a Fulbright Exchange Teacher and participated in several National Science Foundation (NSF) Institutes, including an academic year at Harvard University.

During his first year at Bellport, Cooley met prominent local resident and fellow bird-watcher, adventurer-naturalist Dennis Puleston. Puleston had come to Brookhaven after World War II as Director of Technical Information for Brookhaven National Laboratory. The two "birders" became friends, and soon began a tradition of taking Bellport students along on half-day bird-watching expeditions and nature walks on weekends. They traveled to sites across Long Island and, eventually, beyond.

In 1962, with support from an NSF Marine Science initiative, Cooley went to Bowdoin College in Maine for a marine biology course. Afterward, he instituted a summer marine biology program for his own students — as well as for adults at Stony Brook University. The course included classroom lectures in the mornings and field work in the afternoons.

Cooley also created a full-year course in ornithology at Bellport, which he taught personally from 1970 to 1989 and which continued to be offered for years after his retirement.

In the fall of 1970, he helped launch Bellport's Students for Environmental Quality (SEQ), to which he would serve as club advisor until his own retirement. The initial group of a dozen or so students, mostly juniors and seniors from Cooley's Marine Biology class of the previous summer, coalesced around two issues: 1. East Patchogue's Dodge dealership spilling oil into Swan Lake; and 2. the killing of harbor seals in Moriches Inlet. By 1972 the club had produced The Carmans River Story: A Natural and Human History, which helped designate the river as one of the first Wild, Scenic and Recreational rivers in New York state. In the ensuing years, the club also was instrumental in establishing container deposit legislation, first in Suffolk County and then in New York state, and in protecting harbor seals in New York state.

=== Expeditions ===
In 1970, Cooley's friend, mentor, and fellow EDF trustee Dennis Puleston retired from the Brookhaven National Laboratory and was invited by the National Audubon Society to voyage to Antarctica on the MS Discoverer. The trip was organized by Lars-Eric Lindblad, a pioneer in adventure travel. Twenty years later, as Cooley ended his teaching career, Puleston convinced Lars-Erik's son, Sven Lindblad, to hire Cooley as a naturalist and expedition leader for Lindblad Expeditions.

Cooley traveled with and led Lindblad expeditions during much of the following two decades. On ocean cruises to Alaska, Europe, South America, the South Pacific, and Antarctica, he helped passengers to appreciate the historical, cultural, biological, and environmental significance of the sites they visited and the sights they saw. As he wrote in one of his 'Daily Expedition Reports' while on the National Geographic Endeavour in the South Pacific:

... we did inquire into the nature of things and had an extraordinary day. There is no better rationale for traveling than to seek answers. Even if they are not easily forthcoming, there is much joy in the quest.

== Personal life and death ==
Cooley married Nancy Neinstadt in 1954 and the couple had two children together, Jonathan and Edward Cooley. The couple lived in East Patchogue, New York, until 2004 when he and Nancy divorced. That same year, he remarried Beverly Grant, a retired teacher from La Jolla, California. The couple lived together in California until 2020. Cooley then moved to Colorado to be closer to his son Jonathan and his two grandchildren, Iain and Emma Cooley. He died of natural causes in Grand Junction, Colorado, on January 30, 2022, at the age of 87.
