= Bellport High School =

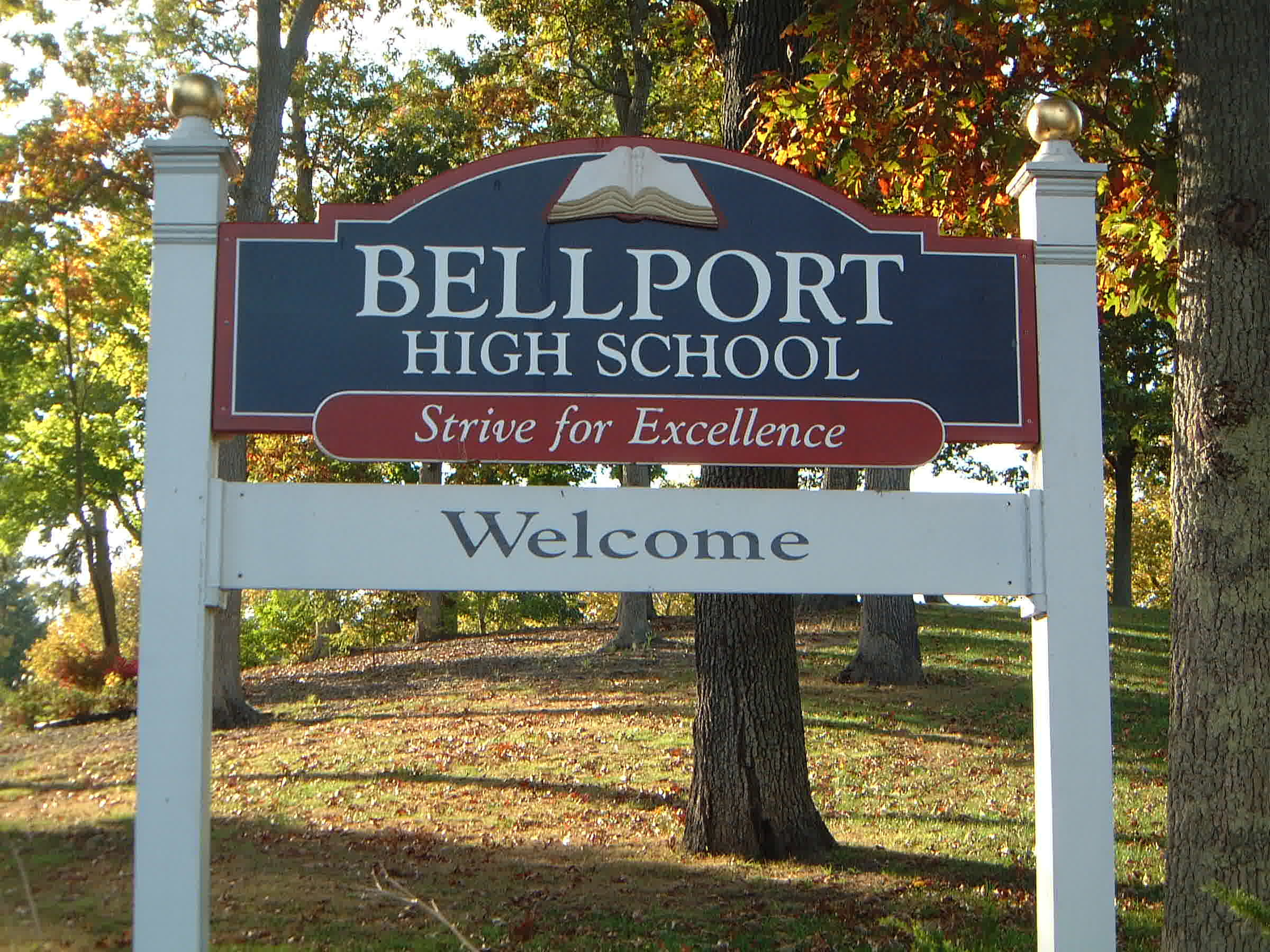

Location
- 205 Beaver Dam Road; Brookhaven, New York; United States; 40.7757°N 72.922512°W

Information
- Type: Public high school
- Motto: Strive for Excellence
- School district: South Country Central School District
- Principal: Erika Della Rosa
- Teaching staff: 115.17 (FTE)
- Grades: 9 to 12
- Enrollment: 1,382 (2023–2024)
- Student to teacher ratio: 12.00
- Colors: Red and Blue
- Mascot: Clipper Ship
- Team name: Clippers
- Website: bhs.southcountry.org

Bellport High School is the public high school for the South Country Central School District, which is located in Suffolk County, Long Island in the United States. It serves students in grades 9-12 in Bellport, North Bellport, Brookhaven and parts of Shirley, East Patchogue, Medford and Yaphank. The principal is Erika Della Rosa. It is preceded by Bellport Middle School.

== Academics ==
According to 2007 data, 75.8% of Bellport graduates earn a New York State Regent's diploma. 51.6% of graduates plan to attend 4-year college, and 33.2% plan to attend a 2-year college, usually Suffolk County Community College.

Advanced Placement courses are offered in European History, U.S. History, U.S. Government and Politics, English Language and Composition, English Literature and Composition, Calculus, Statistics, Art, Art History, Music Theory, Chemistry, Physics, Biology and Environmental Science.

== Athletics ==
Bellport High School competes in the following sports:

Fall

- Cross Country (Boys and Girls)
- Football
- Golf (Boys)
- Soccer (Boys and Girls)
- Tennis (Girls)
- Volleyball (Girls)
- Cheerleading
- Dance

Winter

- Basketball (Boys and Girls)
- Bowling (Boys and Girls)
- Winter Track (Boys and Girls)
- Wrestling (Boys and Girls)
- Cheerleading
- Dance

Spring

- Baseball (Boys)
- Golf (Girls)
- Lacrosse (Boys and Girls)
- Tennis (Boys)
- Softball (Girls)
- Spring Track (Boys and Girls)
- Unified Basketball
- Unified Bowling

=== Football ===
The Football team won the Suffolk County Championship in 1992, 1995, 1996, 1997, 2001, 2005, 2006, 2010, 2021, & 2022. The teams went on to win the Long Island Championship in 1992, 1995, 1997, 2001, 2005, & 2010. This was all achieved while competing in Division 2 of Long Island High School Football in the modern format (four divisions, with a Long Island Championship between the champions of both Nassau County and Suffolk County for each division) was introduced in 1992. Most of these teams were led by coach Joe Cipp, who started the varsity football team at Bellport in 1976 and went on to oversee two teams ranked number one in New York State in 1982 and 2001. He would go on to be inducted into the New York State Public High School Athletic Association Hall Of Fame.

=== Championships ===
The Girls Volleyball team won a Class A Suffolk County Championship during the 2010 season, before losing to Wantagh in the Long Island championship for a spot in the state tournament.

Wrestler Dan Roberts won the New York State championship in 2001 after placing in 4th the previous year.

Wrestler Camryn Howard won a New York State championship in 2025 in the 138-pound weight class and also won the U.S. Marine Corps Junior Nationals championships in the U-16 freestyle at the 157-pound weight class. He has also won three Suffolk County championships.

Ella Masem won a state championship in 2023 as a part of the Intersectional Distance medley relay team representing Section XI.

== Notable faculty ==
- Art Cooley – Biology teacher, naturalist and expedition leader, and a co-founder of the Environmental Defense Fund (EDF).

== Notable alumni ==
- Daniel J. Bernstein (class of 1989), mathematician and computer scientist
- Giovanni Capitello (class of 1997), actor
- Arella Guirantes (class of 2016), professional basketball player and Olympian
- Felix Grucci (class of 1970), politician
- Dennis E. Puleston (class of 1968), archaeologist
- Randy Smith (class of 1967), former NBA player
