= Pandora's Box (British TV series) =

- Title screen
- Written by: Adam Curtis
- Directed by: Adam Curtis
- Theme music composer: Jon King; Andy Gill
- Country of origin: United Kingdom
- Original language: English
- No. of series: 1
- No. of episodes: 6

Production
- Executive producer: Edward Mirzoeff
- Producers: Adam Curtis; Daniel Reed
- Running time: 360 mins (in six parts)
- Production company: BBC

Original release
- Network: BBC Two
- Release: 11 June – 16 July 1992

Related
- The Living Dead (1995)

Pandora's Box, subtitled A Fable From the Age of Science, is a BBC television documentary series by Adam Curtis looking at the consequences of political and technocratic rationalism. It won a BAFTA for Best Factual Series in 1993.

Curtis deals with, in order: Communism in the Soviet Union, systems analysis and game theory during the Cold War, the economy of the United Kingdom during the 1970s, the insecticide DDT, Kwame Nkrumah's leadership in Ghana in the 1950s, and the history of nuclear power.

The documentary makes extensive use of clips from the short film Design for Dreaming, especially in the title sequence. Curtis's later series The Century of the Self and The Trap have similar themes to Pandora's Box.

== Background ==
Adam Curtis explained the background to the series: "I grew up in the late Fifties and Sixties. To me, the scientist was a heroic figure in a white coat, who stood proudly in a gleaming laboratory. Everyone was captivated by the idea that science could be used to build a better world ... since then, the image has been severely tainted, and for me, Pandora's Box will aim to find out why".

Pandora's Box was the first work by Adam Curtis to showcase his subsequently distinctive visual style. He explained: "in Pandora’s Box I wanted to make a sort of funny film about economics. I was just starting out in TV and was almost in tears when editing because I could find nothing to illustrate it and I thought I was going to be sacked. Out of that desperation I started raiding the BBC archive, I remember I even had talking squirrels in it at one point. Stylistically, a lot was born out of that necessity to get things done to a deadline."

== Episodes ==
=== Part 1. 'The Engineers' Plot' ===
This episode, originally broadcast on 11 June 1992, details how the Bolshevik revolutionaries who came into power in 1917 attempted to industrialise and control the Soviet Union with rational scientific methods. The Bolsheviks wanted to turn the Soviet people into scientific beings. Aleksei Gastev used social engineering, including a social engineering machine, to make people more rational.

But Bolshevik politicians and bourgeois engineers came into conflict. Lenin said, "The communists are not directing anything — they are being directed." Stalin arrested 2000 engineers in 1930, eight of whom were convicted in the Industrial Party show trial. Engineering schools gave those loyal to the party only limited training in engineering, to minimise their potential political influence. Industrialised America was used as a template to develop the Soviet Union. Magnitogorsk was built to closely replicate the steel mill city Gary, Indiana. A former worker describes how they went so far as to create metal trees since trees could not grow on the steppe.

By the late 1930s, Stalin-faithful engineers like Leonid Brezhnev, Alexei Kosygin and Nikita Khrushchev grew in influence, due to Stalin eliminating many earlier Bolshevik engineers. They aimed to use engineering in line with Stalin's policies to plan the entire country. At Gosplan, the head institution of central planning, engineers predicted future rational needs. Vitalii Semyonovich Lelchuk, from the USSR Academy of Sciences, describes the level of detail as absurd, "Even the KGB was told the quota of arrests to be made and the prisons to be used. The demand for coffins, novels and movies was all planned." The seemingly rational benchmarks began to have unexpected results. When the plan measured tonnes carried per kilometer, trains went on long journeys simply to meet the quota. Sofas and chandeliers increased in size to meet requirements of material usage.

When Nikita Khrushchev took over after Stalin, he tried to make improvements, including considering prices in the plan. The head of the USSR State Committee for Organization and Methodology of Price Creation is shown with a tall stack of price logbooks declaring, "This shows quite clearly that the system is rational." Academician Victor Glushkov proposed the use of cybernetics to control people as a remedy for the problems of planning. In the 1960s, computers began to be used to process economic data. Consumer demand was calculated by computers from data gathered by surveys. But the time delay in the system meant that items were no longer in demand by the time they had been produced.

When Leonid Brezhnev and Alexei Kosygin took over in the mid-1960s, the economy of the Soviet Union was stagnating. By 1978, the country was in full economic crisis. Production had degenerated to a "pointless, elaborate ritual" and endeavours to improve the plan had been abandoned. The narrator says, "What had begun as a grand moral attempt to build a rational society ended by creating a bizarre, bewildering existence for millions of Soviet people."

==== Contributors ====
- Vitali Semyonovich Lelchuk, USSR Academy of Sciences
- Alexei A. Gastev
- Nikolai Vassilievich Chernobrovov, electrical engineer, 1920s
- Alexei Leontevich Shatilin, "Hero of the Soviet Union"
- Lev Emmanuilovich Razgon, former Bolshevik
- Michael J. Grisak, Gary steelworker, 1930s
- Rosa Dmitrievna Inkina, construction worker, Magnitogorsk
- Evgenii A. Ivanov, Senior Manager, USSR Gosplan
- Valerii Nikolaevich Blinov, managing director, Moscow Toothbrush and Plastic Comb Factory
- Aleksei Sergeevich Vassiliev, Deputy Managing Director in Charge of Quality, Moscow Toothbrush and Plastic Comb Factory
- Leonid Pavlovich Katovskii, taxi driver
- Sergei Mikhailovich Ulanov, Head of Organization and Methodology of Price Creation, USSR State Committee on Prices
- A. S. Fedorenko, Director, Central Economic-Mathematical Institute of the USSR Academy of Sciences
- Abel G. Aganbegyan, economist
- Dr Alexander Nikolaevich Voronov, Director, All Union Scientific Research Institute for the Study of the Population's Demand for Consumer Goods and the Conjuncture of the Market
- Dr Vyacheslav Konstantinovich Nefedov, economist
- Dr Natalya Antonovna Cherkasova, economist

=== Part 2. 'To The Brink of Eternity' ===
This episode, originally broadcast on 18 June 1992, outlines how the United States government and its departments attempted to use systems analysis and game theory to develop strategies to control the nuclear threat and nuclear arms race during the Cold War, and, more specifically, to manage the "loss of control" crises encountered during events such as the Space Race, the Cuban Missile Crisis, and the Vietnam War.

The focus is on the men on whom Dr Strangelove was allegedly based: Herman Kahn, Albert Wohlstetter and John von Neumann. These were mathematical analysts employed by the American RAND Corporation to examine issues of America's national security in the nuclear age. They believed the world could be controlled by the scientific manipulation of fear. One problem, however, was the seemingly unpredictable and irrational nature of politicians, societies, and individuals, which rendered elements of the theory difficult to apply, as well as the challenge of finding accurate, impartial, and unmodified data on which to base concise predictions. In the end, their visions were obscured and became the stuff of science fiction fantasy.

Similar material is also covered in the "F**k You Buddy" part of Curtis's later work The Trap, but To The Brink of Eternity has the focus entirely on the nuclear and military aspects of Cold War strategy, such as planning for and against pre-emptive war. John Nash is not mentioned, and the psychological and economical aspects of game theory are not included. As of April 2024, this is the only episode of the series unavailable for public viewing on Adam Curtis' YouTube channel in the United States.

==== Contributors ====
- Samuel T. Cohen, inventor of the neutron bomb
- Simon Ramo, guided missile engineer, 1950s
- James A. Thomson, President of RAND Corporation
- William Gorham, RAND Corporation 1953–1962; Assistant to Secretary of Department of Health, Education and Welfare 1965–68
- Albert Wohlstetter, RAND Corporation, 1950s
- Amelia Musgrove, bar owner, White Sands
- Thomas Schelling, RAND Corporation 1960–64; Consultant to Department of Defense 1966–70
- Debbie Kahn, daughter of Herman Kahn
- Gail Neale, Hudson Institute, 1960s
- George Ball, Under-Secretary of State in Kennedy administration 1961–66
- William Kaufmann, RAND Corporation; Consultant to Secretary of Defense 1961–80
- William Ehrhart, US Marine Corps 1968
- Col. David Hackworth, US Army (retired)
- Herbert York, former Director of Defense Research and Engineering, Department of Defense
- Jerry Pournelle, chairman, Citizens' Advisory Council on National Space Policy, 1980
- Larry Niven, science fiction writer and member of CACNSP
- Dr Hugh DeWitt, physicist, Lawrence Livermore National Laboratory

=== Part 3. 'The League of Gentlemen' ===
This part, originally broadcast on 22 June 1992, focuses on how both the Conservative and Labour governments of the 1960s attempted to use economists to engineer economic growth to specific targets, as well as programme post-war economic management in the United Kingdom, and attempts to prevent relative economic decline and the perception of the 1960s Wilson governments that devaluation would jeopardise against national self-esteem.

By the mid-1970s, stagflation emerged to confound the Keynesian theories used by policy makers. Meanwhile, a group of economists had managed to convince Margaret Thatcher, Keith Joseph and other British politicians that they had foolproof technical means to make Britain 'great' again. The stagflation of the 1970s catapulted the then obscure economic theory of Monetarism to the forefront of political thought. By the late 1970s Milton Friedman had been awarded the Nobel Memorial Prize in Economics and even some Labour politicians were claiming that government attempts to grow the economy by injecting capital was doing more harm than good by driving up inflation. In 1979, Margaret Thatcher came to power and began to implement these new economic theories to drive down inflation by cutting government spending and raising interest rates, thus tightening the money supply. However, this failed to end inflation straight away, and caused widespread job loss and industrial decline. By the early 1980s, unemployment had risen to 2.5 million, British industrial output had declined by 1/6, and large-scale riots had begun to break out in Britain. The Conservative Government decided to abandon the Monetarist project and lowered interest rates in an attempt to create jobs. In fact, by the mid-1980s Mrs Thatcher claimed in a television interview that she had "never subscribed" to the theories of Milton Friedman.

The episode ends with many of the economists involved in the ill-fated attempts to manage the economy arriving at the same conclusion their predecessors had 30 years before: they could only prevent an economic disaster, not engineer growth. Other economists point out that other countries' successes had more to do with focusing on improving their education systems and industrial bases rather than large-scale attempts to engineer the entire nation's economy. Another economist and adviser to Margaret Thatcher, Alan Budd, worries that the whole Monetarist project might simply have been an attempt to reduce the economic and political power of the working class by raising unemployment and lowering wages, or as he puts it, "creating a reserve army of labour."

==== Contributors ====
- Michael Posner, Economic Adviser to the Treasury 1967–69
- Sir Donald MacDougall, Economic Director, N.E.D.C. 1962–64; Director-General, Department of Economic Affairs 1964–68
- Reza Moghadam, London School of Economics
- Prof. Charles Goodhart, Economic Adviser to the Department of Economic Affairs 1965–67; Chief Economic Adviser on Monetary Policy, Bank of England 1980–85
- Rt Hon. Tony Benn MP, member of Labour cabinet 1964–70
- Brian Reading, Department of Economic Affairs 1964–66
- Prof. Alan Budd, Economic Adviser to the Treasury 1970–74
- Prof. Milton Friedman, Monetarist economist
- Sam Brittan, the Financial Times
- Lord Harris of Highcross, President of Institute of Economic Affairs
- Lord Joseph, member of Conservative cabinet 1970–74; Secretary of State for Industry 1979–81
- Sir Alfred Sherman
- Gordon Pepper, City stockbroker 1962–90
- Roy Adkin, insolvency practitioner, West Midlands
- Sir John Hoskyns, Chief Policy Advisor to Mrs Thatcher 1979–82
- Brian Winterflood, executive director, County NatWest Securities 1986–88
- Ernie Plumb, Chief Inspector, City of London Police Force (retired)
- Richard Turton, Partner, Insolvency Department, Touche Ross

=== Part 4. 'Goodbye Mrs Ant' ===
This part, originally broadcast on 2 July 1992, focuses on attitudes to nature and tells the story of the insecticide DDT, which was first seen as a saviour to humankind in the 1940s, only to be claimed as a part of the destruction of the entire ecosystem in the late 1960s. It also outlines how the sciences of entomology and ecology were transformed by political and economic pressures.

The episode appears to be named after the 1959 film Goodbye, Mrs. Ant. Clips from the 1958 horror movie Earth vs. the Spider and the 1941 grasshopper cartoon Hoppity Goes to Town are also used.

Insects were a huge problem in the United States, and they often ruined entire crops. Emerging in the 1940s, DDT and other insecticides seemed to offer the solution. As more insecticides were invented, the science of entomology changed focus from insect classification, to primarily testing new insecticides and exterminating insects rather than cataloguing them. But as early as 1946–48, entomologists began to notice that insecticides were having a negative impact on other animals, particularly birds.

Chemical companies portrayed the human battle against insects as a struggle for existence, and their promotional films in the 1950s invoke Charles Darwin. Darwin's biographer James Moore notes how the battlefield and life and death aspects of Darwin's theories were emphasised to suit the Cold War years. Scientists believed they were seizing power from evolution and redirecting it by controlling the environment.

In 1962, biologist Rachel Carson released the book Silent Spring, which was the first serious attack on pesticides and outlined their harmful side effects. It caused a public outcry, but had no immediate effect on the use of pesticides. Entomologist Gordon Edwards retells how he made speeches that were critical of Carson's book. He eats some DDT on camera to show how he demonstrated its apparent safety during these talks.

The spraying of DDT in the growing suburbs on America brought the side effects to the attention of the wealthy and articulate middle classes. Victor Yannacone, a suburbanite and lawyer, helped found the Environmental Defense Fund with the aim to legally challenge the use of pesticides. They argued that the chemicals were becoming more poisonous as they spread, as evidenced by the disappearance of the peregrine falcon.

In 1968, they got a hearing on DDT in Madison, Wisconsin. It became headline news, with both sides claiming that everything America stood for was at stake. Biologist Thomas Jukes is shown singing a pro-DDT parody on "America the Beautiful" he sent to Time magazine at the time of the trial. Hugh Iltis describes how, in 1969, a scientist testified at the hearing about how DDT appears in breast milk and accumulates in the fat tissue of babies. This got massive media attention.

Where once chemicals were seen as good, now they were bad. In the late 1960s, ecology was a marginal science. But Yannacone used ecology as a scientific basis to challenge the DDT defenders' idea of evolution. Similar to how the science of entomology had been changed in the 1950s, ecology was transformed by the social and political pressures of the early 1970s. Ecologists became the guardians of the human relationship to nature.

James Moore describes how people try to get Darwin on the side of their view of nature. In The Origin of Species nature is seen as being at war, but also likened to a web of complex relations. Here, Darwin gave people a basis for urging humans not to take control of nature but to cooperate with it. In popular imagination, a scientific theory has a single fixed meaning, but in reality it becomes cultural property, and is usable by different interested parties.

Twenty years later, the story of DDT continues with a press conference announcing the halting of construction in a skyscraper due to a nesting peregrine falcon being found there. Ornithologist David Berger criticises the event for helping to foster the myth of the sensitivity of nature.

Joan Halifax talks about ecology as a gift to human beings and all species, a moral lesson that gave rise not to utopia, but ecotopia.

Politics professor Langdon Winner theorises that social ideals are being read back to us as if they were lessons derived from science itself. The scientific notions of the 1950s, the ideas of endless possibilities for exploitations of nature, are now seen as ill-conceived. And the ideas of ecology today may in 30 or 40 years seem similarly ill-conceived.

The episode ends with a quote from Darwin about seeking divine providence in nature. "I feel most deeply that the whole subject is too profound for the human intellect. A dog might as well speculate on the mind of Newton. Let each man hope and believe what he can."

==== Contributors ====
- Prof. Robert Metcalf, entomologist, National Defense Research Committee 1943–46
- Harry Renken, farmer
- Wilbert Joyce, farmer
- Shirley Briggs, biologist, US Fish and Wildlife Service 1945–48
- Lillard Heddon, crop sprayer 1945–83
- Dr Eugene Kenega, research entomologist, Dow Chemical 1940–82
- Dr Thomas Jukes, research chemist, American Cyanamid Company 1945–63
- James Moore, biographer of Charles Darwin
- J. Gordon Edwards, entomologist
- Lorri Otto, resident of Milwaukee suburb
- Carol Yannacone
- Victor Yannacone
- Daniel Berger, ornithologist, University of Wisconsin 1965–68
- Dr Hugh Iltis, ecologist, University of Wisconsin 1968
- Langdon Winner, historian of science
- Joan Halifax, The Ojai Foundation

=== Part 5. 'Black Power' ===
The penultimate episode, originally broadcast on 9 July 1992, looks at how Kwame Nkrumah, the leader of the Gold Coast (which became Ghana on independence from the United Kingdom in 1957) from 1952 to 1966, set Africa ablaze with his vision of a new industrial and scientific age. At the heart of his dream was to be the huge Volta River dam, generating enough power to transform West Africa into an industrialised utopia and focal point of post-colonial Pan-Africanism.

At first, it was hoped the U.K. would help to finance the project, but after the Suez Crisis of 1956, interest was lost. Later, after meeting U.S. Presidents Dwight D. Eisenhower and John F. Kennedy, American backing for the project materialised. A scheme was finally drawn up offering Kaiser Aluminum favourable conditions (including the smelting of aluminium imported from outside Ghana) and the dam was opened to great fanfare in January 1966. Weeks later, in February 1966, while Nkrumah was on a state visit to North Vietnam and China, his government was overthrown in a military coup (possibly CIA backed), and evidence of massive corruption and debt was revealed. As of 1992, for many Ghanaians the promised benefits of the project were still unrealised.

==== Contributors ====
- Al Haji Futa, Ghanaian negotiating team
- Kojo Botsio, Minister of Education 1951–57
- Sqn Ldr Clen Sowu, Assistant Exhibition Officer 1956; Rawlings Government 1982–85
- Kwesi Lamptey, Opposition MP 1951–57
- James Moxon, Public Relations Spokesman, Volta River Project
- Komla Gbedemah, Minister of Finance 1957–61
- Ron Sullivan, lawyer for Kaiser Aluminum on Volta Project 1959–79
- Lloyd Cutler, lawyer for Kaiser Aluminum on Volta Project
- J. Burke Knapp, Senior Vice President, World Bank 1956–78
- Prof. Akilagpa Sawyerr, Vice Chancellor, University of Ghana 1985–92
- Bill Mahoney, US Ambassador to Ghana 1962–65
- George Ball, Under-Secretary of State in Kennedy administration 1961–66
- Dr. Jonathan Frimpong-Ansah, Deputy Governor, Ghana Central Bank 1965–68
- Louis Casely-Hayford, dam engineer 1966
- John Stockwell, CIA officer in West Africa during coup
- Divine Tetteh, school teacher, resettlement village
- J. G. A. Renner, Minister for Lands and Natural Resources 1982–86

=== Part 6. 'A Is for Atom' ===
This final episode, originally broadcast on 16 July 1992, is named after a 1953 General Electric promotional film called A Is for Atom. The episode gives an insight into the history of nuclear power. In the 1950s, scientists and politicians thought they could create a different world with a limitless source of nuclear energy. But things started to go wrong. Scientists in America and the Soviet Union were duped into building dozens of potentially dangerous nuclear power plants. For business reasons, General Electric and Westinghouse decided that the types sold would be versions based on the reactors used in nuclear submarines, but sold with dubious claims made about their cost effectiveness and safety.

However, in 1964, at the Atomic Energy Commission it was found that while small reactors were safe, the bigger core sizes as used in power plants were potentially susceptible to nuclear meltdown—an accident where the reactor core could melt through the bottom of the reactor containment vessel. A study showed this could potentially happen, and if it did, it could damage the reactor. These concerns were largely kept from the public. The episode goes into some detail over attempts to find solutions to the meltdown issue.

In the Soviet Union, reactors were considered too expensive, until Brezhnev came to power. Under his leadership, Anatoly Petrovich Alexandrov designed cheap reactors that were produced at high speed, with very few safety features, sometimes not even containment vessels. This was publicly criticized by experts, but the experts were sidelined.

In Britain, by 1974, delays to its native advanced gas cooled reactor power plant caused Britain to adopt the American PWR design of reactors.

However, in America it was being discovered that safety systems that had to work to avoid meltdown could not be guaranteed to work reliably in the complex circumstances in a nuclear reactor. Tests run on the emergency core-cooling systems to deal with pipe breaks, performed on the Atomic Energy Commission's test models in Idaho in 1971, repeatedly failed; often the water was forced out of the core under pressure. It was discovered that the theoretical calculations had no correspondence with reality. Nevertheless, they had not necessarily proved that they wouldn't work on a real reactor, so they decided to carry on with mandated safety systems, that the best evidence suggested, may well not function in the event of an accident.

Engineers and scientists and regulators that tried to publicise the potential issues found that their concerns were not published, and these issues remained largely unknown to the public, and nuclear power had a high degree of confidence with the public.

Then came the disasters of Three Mile Island in 1979 and Chernobyl in 1986, which changed public views on the safety of this new technology. It revealed that the industry had been hiding the problems and unpredictable nature of these types of reactors, and that they had imposed risks on the public, without consultation.

It ends with the points that the forms of the reactors were chosen only for business reasons. There are very broad range of scientific and engineering options which were not explored. Therefore, perhaps nuclear power should be led by public decisions and redeveloped, but from a more morality-centred point of view.

==== Contributors ====
- Dr. Chauncey Starr, physicist, Manhattan Project 1943–46
- Prof. Yurii I. Koryakin, Head of Research, USSR Institute of Power Research
- Vladimir I. Merkin, designer of first Soviet civilian reactor
- Sir Kelvin Spencer, Chief Scientist, Ministry of Power 1954–59
- Alvin Weinberg, Director, Oak Ridge National Laboratory 1955–71
- Dr. Glenn Seaborg, chairman, Atomic Energy Commission 1961–71
- Dr. David Okrent, chairman, Advisory Committee on Reactor Safeguards 1966
- Christopher Hinton (interviewed 1974)
- Robert Pollard, reactor engineer, Atomic Energy Commission 1969–76
- Dr. Victor Gilinsky, Nuclear Regulatory Commissioner 1975–84
- Yuriy Shcherbak, Ukrainian journalist and MP
- Joseph Morone, nuclear historian

There is also a more extensive version who includes interviews with Edward Teller and Bertram Bogardus, from Technocracy Inc.
