= Chultun =

Mayan underground storage chamber

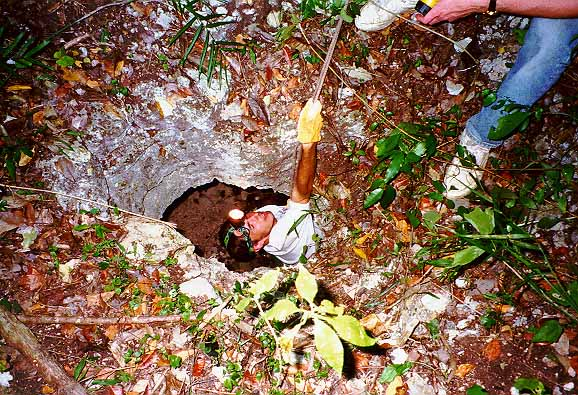
An archaeologist investigating a chultún

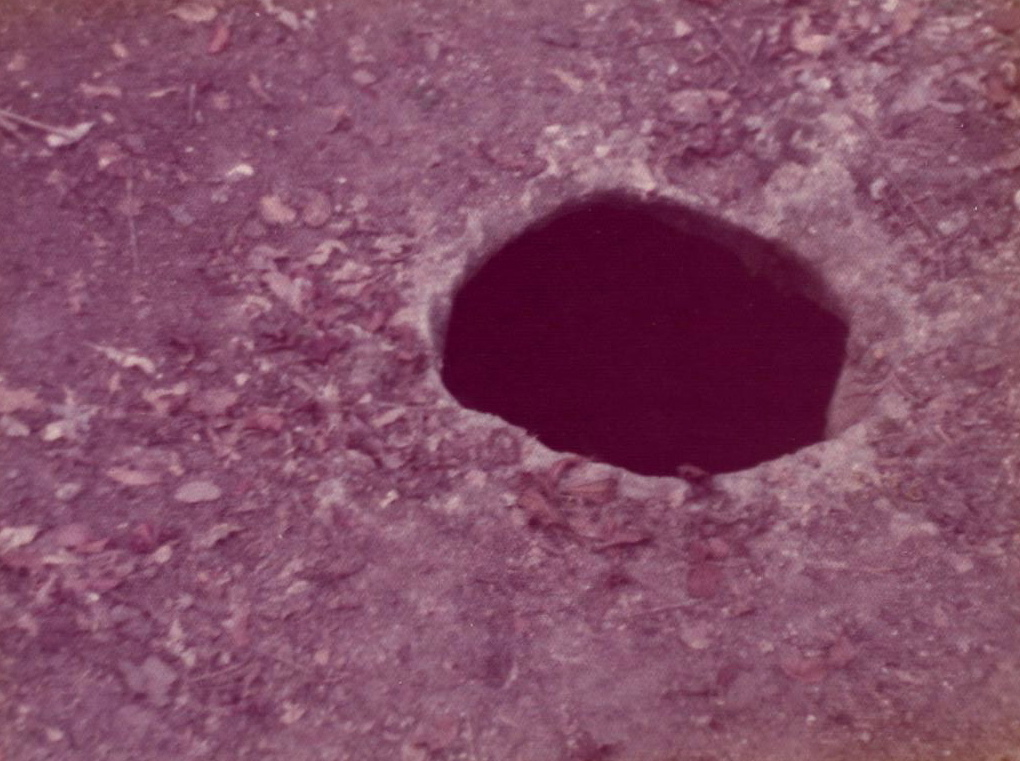
Entrance to chultún at Xunantunich

A chultún (or chultun, plural: chultunob' or chultúns) is a bottle-shaped underground storage chamber built by the pre-Columbian Maya in southern Mesoamerica. Their entrances were surrounded by plastered aprons which guided rainwater into them during the rainy seasons. Most of these archaeological features likely functioned as cisterns for potable water.

Chultunob' were typically constructed in locations where naturally occurring cenotes were absent (such as the Puuc hills, which sit hundreds of feet above the Yucatán Peninsula aquifer). While many were constructed to collect water, not all may have served that purpose. Some chultúns may have been used for storage of perishable comestibles or for the fermentation of alcoholic beverages. Experimental research conducted in the 1960s by Mayanist Dennis E. Puleston demonstrated that chultúns around Tikal were particularly effective for long-term storage of ramon nuts (Brosimum alicastrum).

Associated with water, rain, and child sacrifice, chultunob' are widely viewed as points of access to the Maya underworld. This makes chultunob' an excellent source of information on both the life and death of ancient settlements of the Prehispanic Maya.

== See also ==
- Americas (terminology)
- Indigenous peoples of Mexico
- Indigenous peoples of the Americas
- Mesoamerican region
