= Yale Corporation =

Governing body of Yale University

The Seal of the Trustees of Yale College

The President and Fellows of Yale College, also known as the Yale Corporation or the Board of Trustees, is the governing body of Yale University in New Haven, Connecticut.

== Assembly of corporation ==
The Corporation comprises 19 members:

- Three ex officio members: the president of the university, the governor, and the lieutenant governor of the State of Connecticut
- Ten "Successor Trustees" who elect their own successors
- Six "Alumni Fellows" who are elected by the body of Yale alumni

While Article 8 Section 3 of the Constitution of the State of Connecticut recognizes a 1792 Act of the Connecticut General Assembly, which established the governor, lieutenant governor, and six members of the State Senate as ex officio members of the Corporation, an 1871 act of the Connecticut Legislature gave Yale alumni the right to elect the six posts formerly occupied by state senators. As explained by 20th-century Yale historian George Pierson:

In the 1750s President Clap did cause or engineer two great breaks: the separation of the College from the churches by the setting up of an independent college church, and separation of the College from the state by the refusal of inspection and termination of colony support. But the second separation proved unsuccessful. So Stiles and his trustees had to bring political authorities back into the management of the College by adding the governor, lieutenant governor, and six senior assistants to the Fellows of the Corporation in return for some monies and for the confirmation of the colonial charter. So, whatever the traditions or later assumptions, Yale College would not find itself operationally free from political supervision until 1872, when by law six alumni fellows or trustees were allowed to be substituted for the six senior senators of the Corporation.

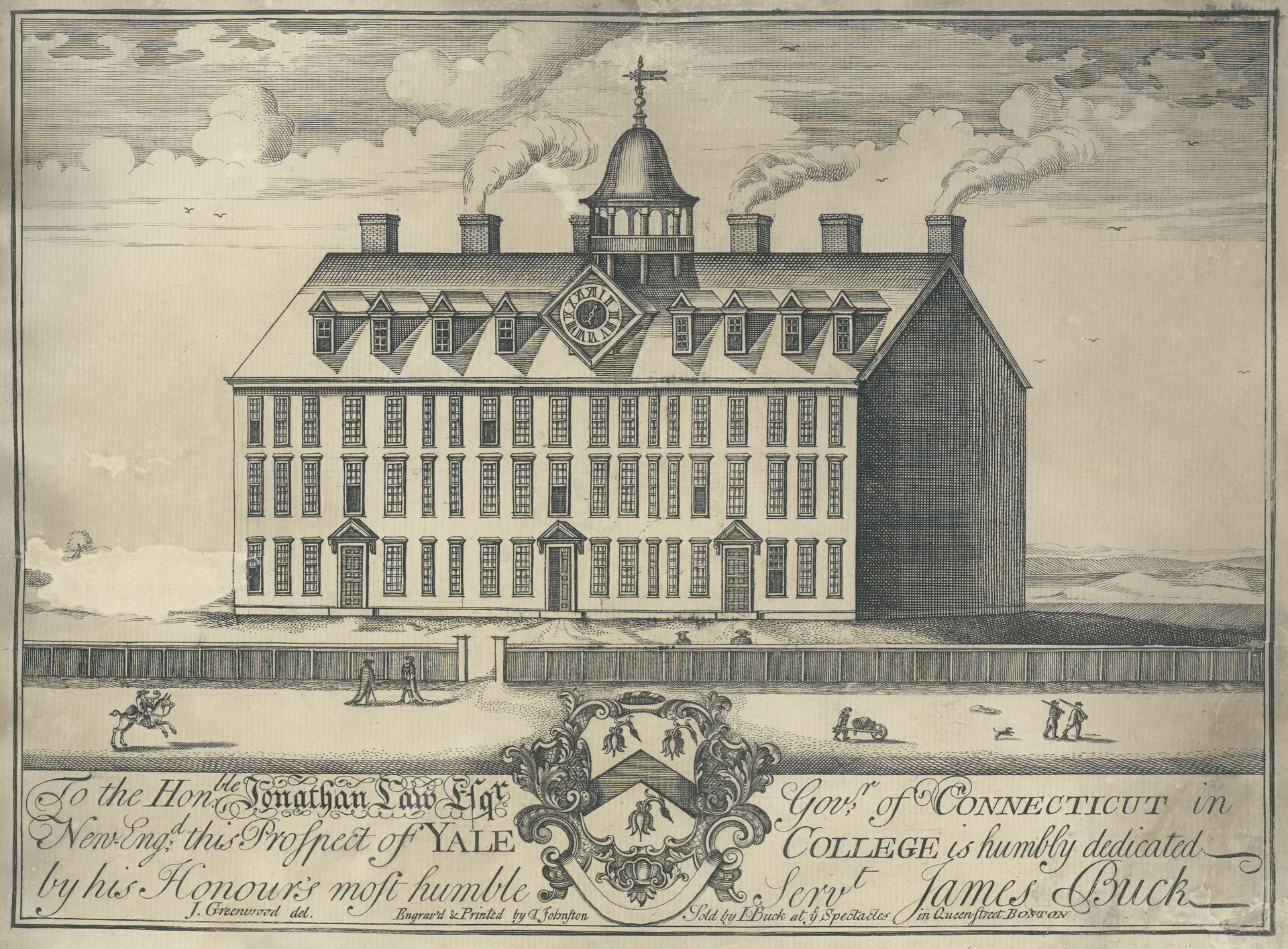
Yale's first building, the College House, with the coat of arms of Jonathan Law

In the late nineteenth century, it became a point of debate whether the Successor Trustees needed to remain Connecticut ministers. In 1905, the trustees selected their first non-minister successor, Payson Merrill. By 1917, half the Successor Trustees were laypersons.

== List of corporation members ==
The members of the Yale Corporation were the following, and had the following roles as of July 2025, according to the Yale University webpages concerning the Corporation:

Position	Name	Academic degrees	Description
Trustee	Gina Rosselli Boswell (successor trustee)	B.S., Yale M.B.A. '89	Former chief executive officer of Bath & Body Works, Inc.
Trustee ex officio	Susan Bysiewicz	Yale '83 B.A., J.D.	Lieutenant governor of Connecticut
Trustee	Michael J. Cavanagh (successor trustee)	Yale B.A. '88, J.D.	President of Comcast Corporation
Trustee	Maryana Iskander (alumni fellow)	B.A., M.Sc., Yale '03 J.D.	Chief executive officer of the Wikimedia Foundation
Trustee	William Earl Kennard (successor trustee)	B.A., Yale '81 J.D.	Co-founding partner of Astra Capital Management
Trustee	Fred Krupp (alumni fellow)	Yale '75 B.S., J.D.	President of the Environmental Defense Fund (EDF)
Trustee ex officio	Edward Miner "Ned" Lamont Jr.	B.A., Yale '80 M.B.A.	Governor of Connecticut
President	Maurie McInnis	B.A., Yale M.A. '90, Yale Ph.D. '96	24th president of Yale University
Trustee	Carlos R. Moreno (alumni fellow)	Yale '70 B.A., J.D.	Independent mediator with Judicial Arbitration and Mediation Services
Trustee	Felicia F. Norwood (alumni fellow)	B.S., M.A., Yale '89 J.D.	Executive vice president and president of government health benefits at Elevance Health (formerly Anthem, Inc.)
Trustee	Carter Brooks Simonds (successor trustee)	Yale '99 B.A., M.B.A.	Managing partner of Four Pines Partners
Trustee	Joshua L. Steiner (successor trustee)	Yale '87 B.A., M.St.	Partner at SSW and member of the board of directors at Bloomberg, L.P.
Trustee	David Sze (successor trustee)	Yale '88 B.A., M.B.A.	Partner at Greylock Partners
Trustee	Jaime Teevan (alumni fellow)	Yale '98 B.S., Ph.D.	Chief scientist and technical fellow at Microsoft
Senior trustee	Martha L. Tellado (successor trustee)	B.A., Yale Ph.D. '02	Chief executive officer of Consumer Reports
Trustee	David A. Thomas (alumni fellow)	Yale '78 B.A., M.A., Yale '84 M.A., Yale '86 Ph.D.	President emeritus of Morehouse College
Trustee	Neal S. Wolin (successor trustee)	Yale '83 B.A., M.Sc., Yale '88 J.D.	Vice chairman of the global advisory firm Brunswick Group
