= Marta L. Tellado =

American business executive

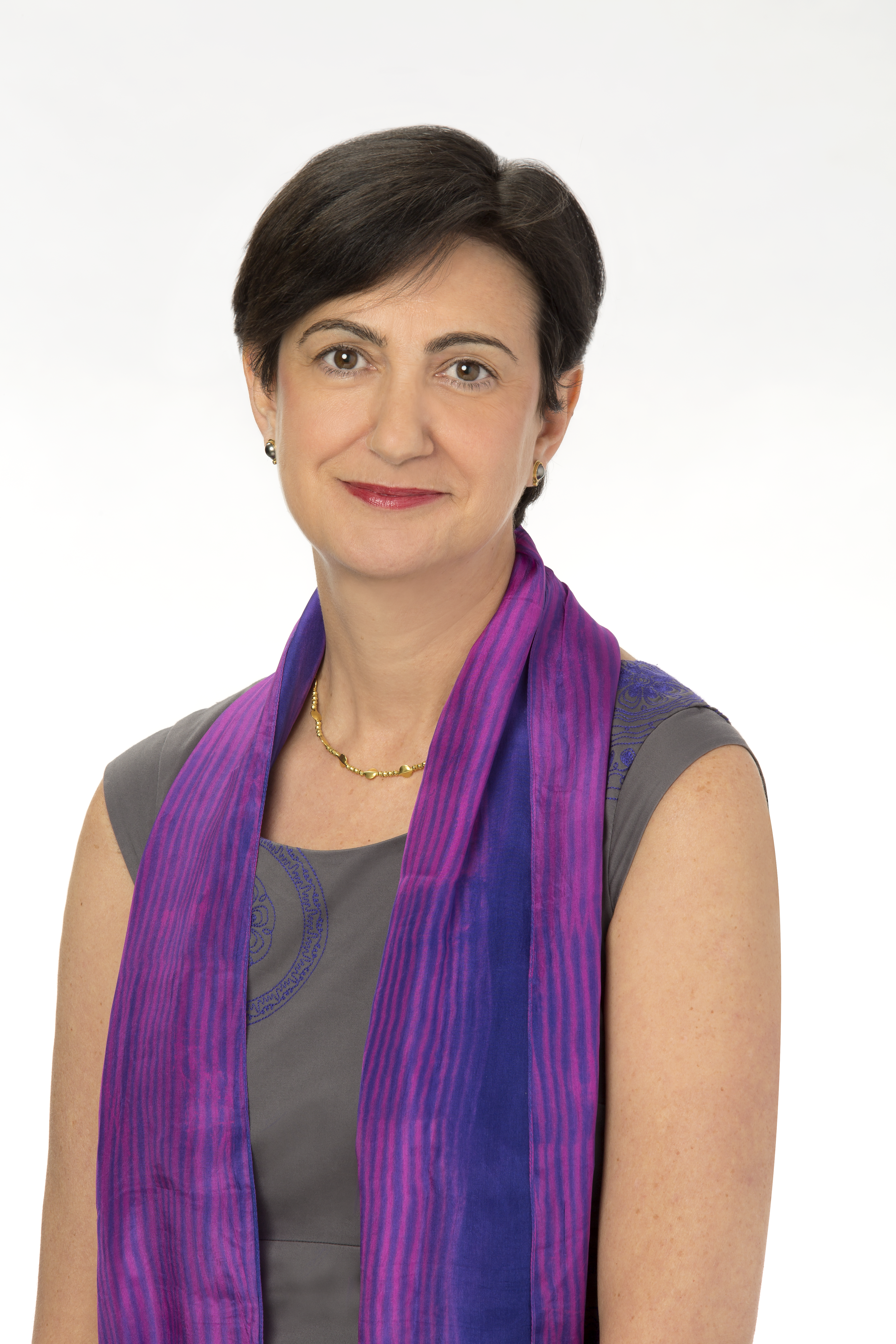
Tellado in 2015

Marta L. Tellado (born ca. 1959) is a Cuban-born American business executive. She was president and Chief Executive Officer of Consumer Reports.

== Early life and education ==
Marta Lourdes Tellado was born in Cuba. In 1961, when Tellado was two years old, she and her family left Havana for the U.S. as political refugees.

After completing an undergraduate degree in 1981 at Fairleigh Dickinson University, Tellado went to Public Citizen’s Congress Watch, a nonprofit group. She continued her education at Yale University, earning a Ph.D. in political science in 2002.

== Career ==
Representing her home state of New Jersey, Tallado worked with U.S. Senator Bill Bradley as his director of issues and outreach and advisor on social policy. Tellado's policy-related roles have included executive director of the Domestic Policy Group at the Aspen Institute; director for national issues and outreach for Senator Bill Bradley; and vice president of the Partnership for Public Service, where she launched the Best Places to Work in the federal government and the Service to America awards.

From 2004 to 2014, she served as vice president for global communications and an officer of the board at the Ford Foundation. Tellado left that role in 2014 to become president and chief executive officer of Consumer Reports.

Tellado has been featured as a consumer expert on a number of media platforms, including Marketplace Morning Report, CBS News Sunday Morning, the Pivot podcast, The Seattle Times, USA Today, CNN, and Forbes, as well as local radio and television media outlets.

In 2018, Tellado was the commencement speaker at Fairleigh Dickinson University.

In 2022, Tellado released a book: Buyer Aware: Harnessing Our Consumer Power for a Safe, Fair, and Transparent Marketplace.

Tellado serves on the boards of the Yale Corporation, Omidyar Network, International Consumer Research & Testing, and Consumers International. She previously served on the boards of Fairleigh Dickinson University, the Council on Foundations, Ballet Hispanico, The Washington Center, Hispanics in Philanthropy, and Advertising Council Advisory Board on Public Issues.

Tellado stepped down from her position at Consumer Reports at the end of January 2025. She was succeeded by Phil Radford.

== Selected works ==
- Buyer Aware: Harnessing Our Consumer Power for a Safe, Fair, and Transparent Marketplace (Public Affairs, 2022). ISBN 9781541768567
