= Giovanni Capitello =

American actor / filmmaker

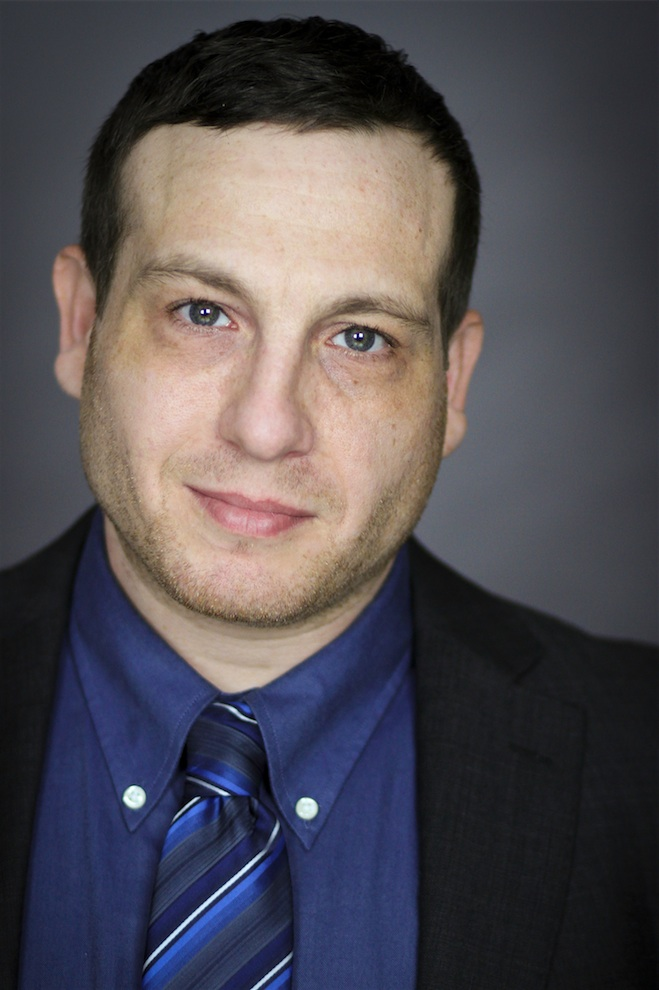
- Actor/Filmmaker
- Born: Giovanni Familiare Capitello; August 27, 1979 (age 46); Brooklyn, New York, U.S.
- Other name: Gio
- Years active: 2000–present
- Website: http://www.GioCap.com, http://www.MagicMindMedia.com

Giovanni Familiare Capitello (born August 27, 1979, in Brooklyn, New York) is an American actor / filmmaker.

== Background ==
Capitello is of Sicilian and German descent and was born in Brooklyn (1979) and raised in East Patchogue, New York. He attended Bellport High School (1994–1997).

== Career ==
He started studying acting at The School for Film and Television in New York City (now known as The New York Conservatory for Dramatic Arts) where he learned the Sanford Meisner technique. After acting school he appeared in many independent films and in a major motion picture, Keeping the Faith (2000). Giovanni later studied filmmaking and acquired a filmmaking and multimedia degree. His first film he directed and acted in was Manic (2005), starring independent movie star Dave Vescio. Early on Giovanni worked on a documentary based on the birth of the hip-hop and graffiti culture, Hip-Hop Diaries (2006), that aired on a major television network in Europe (Sky TV, 2006). Giovanni directed a thriller/suspense film in the town he grew up in, Patchogue, titled Hanging Tree (2011). Other works include: The Elevator Game (2015), Warning Label (2014), Say Something (2015) and television pilot Girls Night Out (2007). Giovanni founded his own video production/media company, Magic Mind Media.

== Filmography (Actor) ==
Year	Film Credit	Role	Type
2016	Betrayed	Detective Barnes	TV series
2016	Murder Book	Police Officer	TV series
2014	Deadly Wives	Gang Leader	TV series
2013	Unusual Suspects	Donny Wayne Banks	TV series
2011	Prison Diaries	Randy Wiggins	TV series
2011	Lore: Deadly Obsession	Policeman	TV movie
2011	Threading Needles	Officer Stuart	Feature Film
2010	The Wife	Donovan	Short Film
2010	Marathon	Luis	Feature Film by Biju Viswanath.
2005	Manic	The Manic	Short Film
2000	Keeping the Faith	Bartender	Feature Film by Edward Norton.

== Filmography (Director) ==
Year – Type	Film – Video	Director	Company
2016 – TV Series Short	Timid Tales	Giovanni Capitello	Magic Mind Media.
2015 – Film	The Elevator Game	Giovanni Capitello	Magic Mind Media.
2015 – Short Film	Qualms of Conscience	Giovanni Capitello	Magic Mind Media.
2015 – Short Film	Say Something	Giovanni Capitello	Magic Mind Media.
2014 – Film	Warning Label	Giovanni Capitello	Magic Mind Media.
2011 – Film	Hanging Tree	Giovanni Capitello	Magic Mind Media.
2007 – Television Pilot	Girls Night Out	Giovanni Capitello	Magic Mind Media, NBC Universal
2006 – Short Film	Last One	Giovanni Capitello	Magic Mind Media.
2006 – Short Film	Playlist	Giovanni Capitello	Magic Mind Media; Missionary Records.
2005	Manic	Giovanni Capitello	Magic Mind Media.
