= South Country Central School District =

School district in New York, United States

Coordinates: 40°45′44″N 72°57′42″W

Location
- Brookhaven, Suffolk County, New York; United States

District information
- Type: Public School District
- Motto: "a tradition of quality... a future of excellence."
- Grades: K-12 (till 2015), pre K-12 (2015 to present)
- President: Christopher Ross
- Vice-president: Robert Felicetta
- Superintendent: Joseph Giani (2013-2022); Antonio Santana (2022–2026)
- Schools: 7

Other information
- District Offices: 189 Dunton Avenue; East Patchogue, NY
- Website: www.southcountry.org

The South Country Central School District is a district of approximately 16 square miles (41 km^{2}) located in southern Brookhaven Town, in Suffolk County, New York, United States. The district serves the entirety of the Village of Bellport and the hamlets of North Bellport and Brookhaven, along with parts of East Patchogue, Shirley, Yaphank, and Medford.

== History ==
=== Bellport High School Fire ===
On March 8, 1963, at 1:55 pm, fire broke out in the auditorium at the original Bellport High School (now Bellport Middle School). Nine–hundred students were evacuated from class at the time, and over forty students, faculty, and firefighters were sent to the hospital. The Bellport community rallied and assisted the Bellport Fire Department in putting out the fire. Miraculously, there were no fatalities. This is in part due to a makeshift tarpaulin chute put together and a combined effort from firefighters, students, faculty, and the community alike.

=== Temporary Closure Due To Racial Tension ===
On January 16, 1970, the district had to close Bellport High School for a day due to racial tensions. There were repeated fights between White and Black students both inside and out of the High School and also a sit-in protest. The New York Times interviewed assistant principal Robert Gardner, and the story made the January 17, 1970, issue. In an attempt to ease tensions, and have interaction between White and Black students, the High School hired several Black staff members.

== Schools ==
The following is a table of all the current schools used by the South Country Central School District

School name	Type of school	Address	Grades	Hours
Bellport High School	High School	205 Beaver Dam Road Brookhaven, NY	9-12	7:09 am to 1:55 pm
Bellport Middle School	Middle School	5 Kreamer St Bellport, NY	6-8	7:54 am to 2:34 pm
Frank P. Long Intermediate School	Intermediate School	599 Brookhaven Ave Bellport, NY	4-5	8:20 am to 2:40 pm
Brookhaven Elementary School	Elementary School	101 Fireplace Neck Rd Brookhaven, NY	K-3	9:20 am to 3:20 pm
Verne W. Critz Elementary School	Elementary School	185 N Dunton Ave East Patchogue, NY	K-3	9:20 am to 3:20 pm
Kreamer Elementary School	Elementary School	37 Kreamer St Bellport, NY	K-3	9:20 am to 3:20 pm
South Haven Early Childhood Center	Preschool	2714 Montauk Hwy Brookhaven, NY	Pre-K	9:00 am to 11:30 am and 12:30 pm to 3:00 pm
