= Fred Krupp =

American lawyer

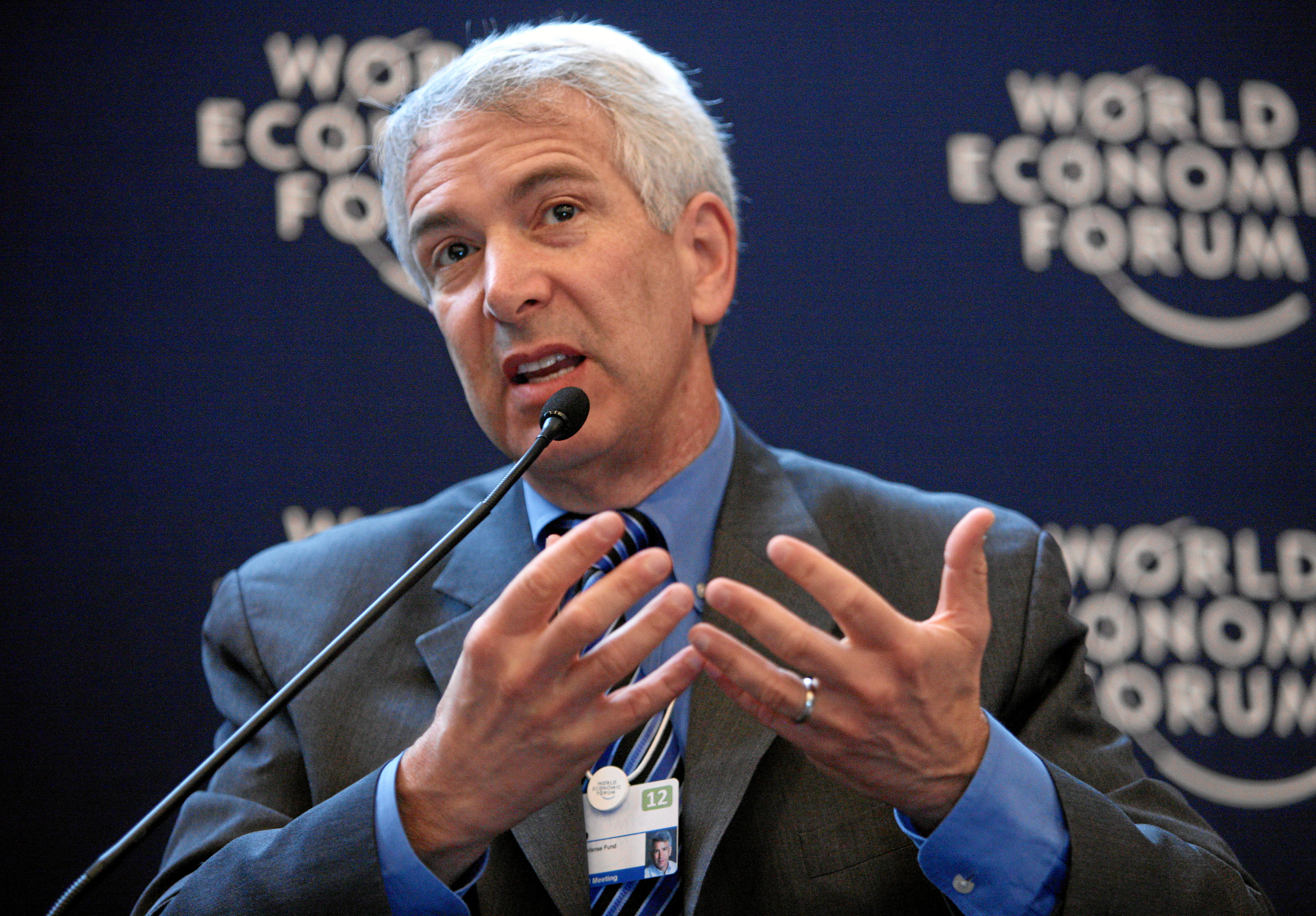
- Krupp at the World Economic Forum Annual Meeting in 2012
- Education: Yale University (BA); University of Michigan (JD)
- Occupations: President, Environmental Defense Fund

Fred Krupp has been the president of Environmental Defense Fund, a U.S.-based nonprofit environmental advocacy group since 1984. He has worked towards convincing corporations of the benefits of environmentalism. This has included convincing McDonald's and Duke Energy to make environmentally conscious business decisions. Krupp is also an advocate for legislative action on environmental issues; he successfully advocated for passage of the acid rain reduction plan in the 1990 Clean Air Act and the 2022 Inflation Reduction Act.

In 2015, Krupp received the William K. Reilly Environmental Leadership Award.

== Early life and education ==
Krupp grew up in Verona, New Jersey, and became acquainted with recycling through his father's company, which used old rags to create roofing material. He graduated from Yale University in 1975. He earned J.D. in 1978 from the University of Michigan Law School. He later taught environmental law at Yale and University of Michigan.

== Career ==
=== Early career ===
Prior to joining Environmental Defense Fund, Krupp spent several years in private law practice in New Haven, Connecticut, at several firms: Cooper, Whitney, Cochran & Krupp and Albis & Krupp. During that time he also was founder and general counsel for the Connecticut Fund for the Environment (1978–1984), a state-level environmental group.

=== Environmental Defense Fund ===
Since 1984, when he became president of Environmental Defense Fund, he has been influential in developing several market-based solutions, including the acid rain reduction plan in the 1990 Clean Air Act. He has been described as the environmentalist who "has been the most successful in persuading the corporate world—and those who support its interests—to embrace the green cause". Examples including convincing McDonald's to forgo styrofoam for paper, Wal-Mart to stock energy-efficient light bulbs, and Duke Energy to invest in wind power.

Krupp has advocated for reducing methane pollution. In 2017, he criticized natural gas because the release of methane along the supply chain "made [natural gas] just as bad an energy source as coal from a greenhouse gas perspective". Ben van Beurden, then CEO of Shell, canceled a meeting with Krupp because of Krupp's criticism of natural gas. In 2018, Krupp announced that an affiliate of EDF planned to launch an orbital satellite, MethaneSAT, to monitor industrial methane leaks.

In 2022, Krupp was one of the advocates for the Inflation Reduction Act.

=== Other activities ===
Krupp served on the board of the H. John Heinz III Center for Science, Economics and the Environment, and the Leadership Council of the Yale School of Forestry and Environmental Studies. He has served on the President's Advisory Committee on Trade Policy and Negotiations for Presidents Bill Clinton and George W. Bush.

He is the recipient of the 1999 Keystone Leadership in Environment Award, and the 2002 Champion Award from the Women's Council on Energy and the Environment.

In 2008, his book, Earth: The Sequel, co-written with Miriam Horn, was published. The book highlights technology that aims to fight global warming.

In 2014, Krupp was awarded an honorary degree from Haverford College.

He was elected by fellow alumni to serve as an alumni fellow of Yale's Board of Trustees for a six-year term beginning on July 1, 2022. In June 2023, he earned an honorary degree from Williams College and gave the commencement address.

== Personal life ==
He lives in Connecticut with his wife, Laurie. They have three children.

As an avid rower, he won a gold medal in the 2006 World Rowing Masters Regatta sponsored by the World Rowing Federation. At the 2010 U.S. Rowing Masters Nationals Regatta, he won a silver medal in the Mixed Open F 4X.
