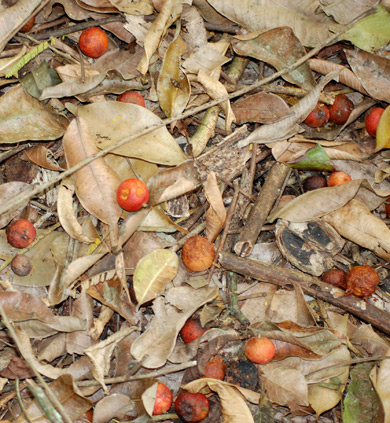

Conservation status
- Least Concern (IUCN 3.1)

Scientific classification
- Kingdom: Plantae
- Clade: Tracheophytes
- Clade: Angiosperms
- Clade: Eudicots
- Clade: Rosids
- Order: Rosales
- Family: Moraceae
- Genus: Brosimum
- Species: B. alicastrum

Binomial name
- Brosimum alicastrum Sw.

Subspecies
- Brosimum alicastrum subsp. alicastrum; Brosimum alicastrum subsp. bolivarense (Pittier) C.C.Berg

Synonyms
- Piratinera alicastrum (Sw.) Baill.; synonyms of subsp. alicastrum: Brosimum conzattii Standl.; Brosimum gentlei Lundell; Brosimum terrabanum Pittier; Ficus faginea Kunth & C.D.Bouché; Helicostylis ojoche K.Schum. ex Pittier; Piratinera terrabana (Pittier) Lundell; Urostigma fagineum (Kunth & C.D.Bouché) Miq.; synonyms of subsp. bolivarense: Brosimum bernadetteae Woodson; Brosimum bolivarense (Pittier) Romero; Brosimum columbianum S.F.Blake; Brosimum latifolium Standl.; Brosimum uleanum Mildbr.; Helicostylis bolivarensis Pittier; Helicostylis latifolia Pittier

= Brosimum alicastrum =

Species of tree

Brosimum alicastrum, commonly known as ojoxitli (from Nahuatl, Hispanicized as ojite or ojoche), (Note: also: ojushte, ujushte, ujuxte) ramón (also ramón de vaca), breadnut, Maya nut and many others, is a tree species in the family Moraceae of flowering plants, whose other genera include figs and mulberries. It is native to Mexico, Central America, northern and western South America, and to Cuba and Jamaica in the western Caribbean.

The species was described by Olof Swartz in 1788. Two subspecies are accepted:

- B. a. subsp. alicastrum
- B. a. subsp. bolivarense (Pittier) C.C.Berg

== Description ==
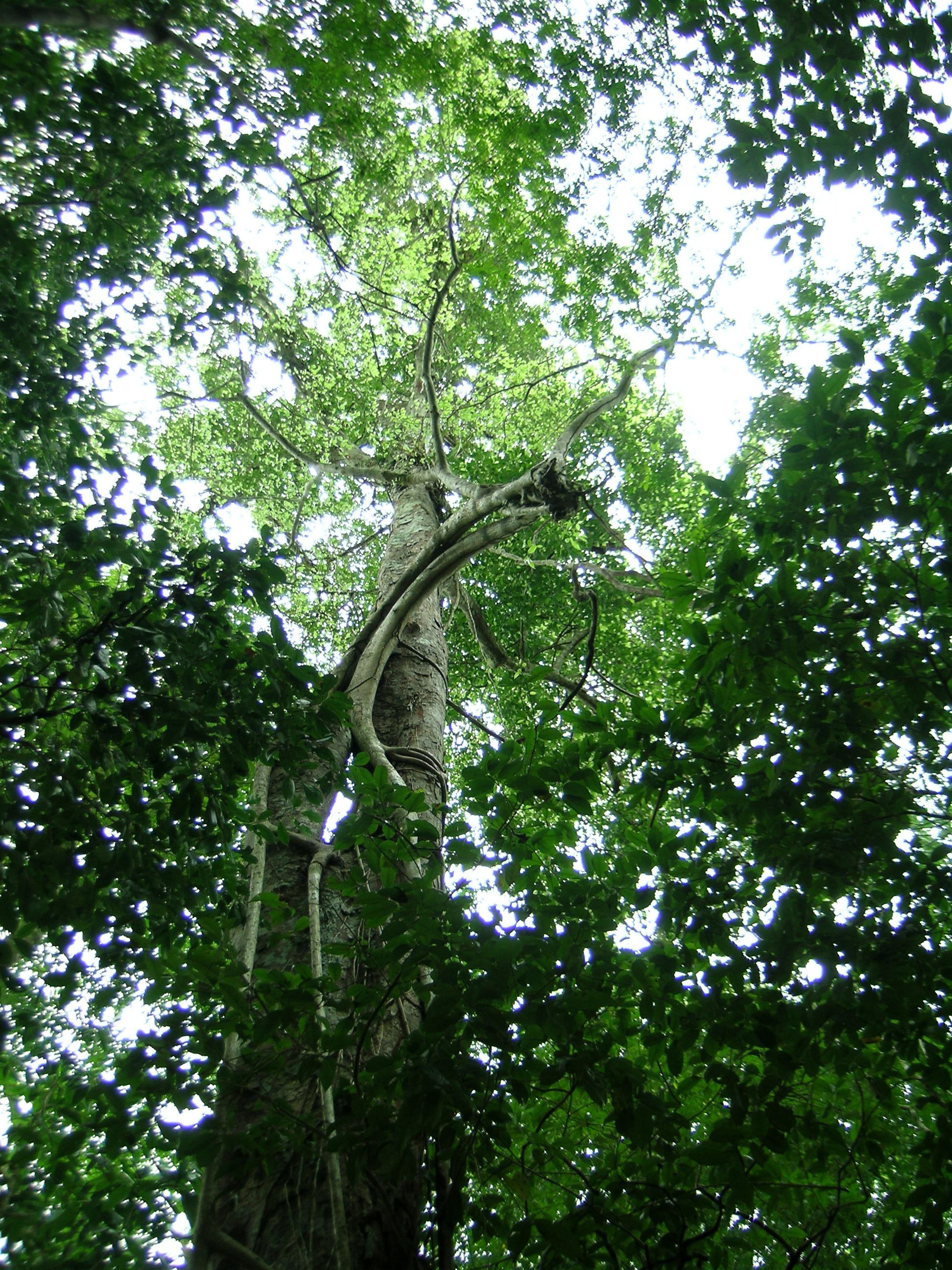
Mature tree

Brosimum alicastrum can be monoecious, dioecious or hermaphroditic, changing from female to male as they age. Birds and bats are responsible for the dispersion of the seeds. A tree can produce 150–180 kilograms (330–400 lb) of fruits per year. It stays productive for 120–150 years. The tree can grow up to 45 m (150 ft) in height and up to 1.5 m (5 ft) in diameter. It starts producing flowers and fruits when the tree's trunk reaches 20 m (66 ft) high. When planted from seed in full sun, fruiting can start at 3.5 years.

== Distribution and habitat ==
This tree is found on the west coast of central Mexico and in southern Mexico (Yucatán, Campeche), Guatemala, El Salvador, the Caribbean, and the Amazon basin. Large stands occur in moist lowland tropical forests at 300–2,000 m (980–6,560 ft) elevation (especially 125–800 m), in humid areas with annual rainfall of 600–2,000 mm (24–79 in), and average temperatures of 24 °C (75 °F).

The Maya nut fruit disperses on the ground at different times throughout its range. It has a large seed covered by a thin, citrus-flavored, orange-colored skin favored by a number of forest creatures.

== Cultivation ==
=== Among Aztecs ===
The Libellus de Medicinalibus Indorum Herbis which documented 16th century Aztec ethnobotany identifies it with the name of tlalcacapol or "earth cherry".

=== Among Mayans ===
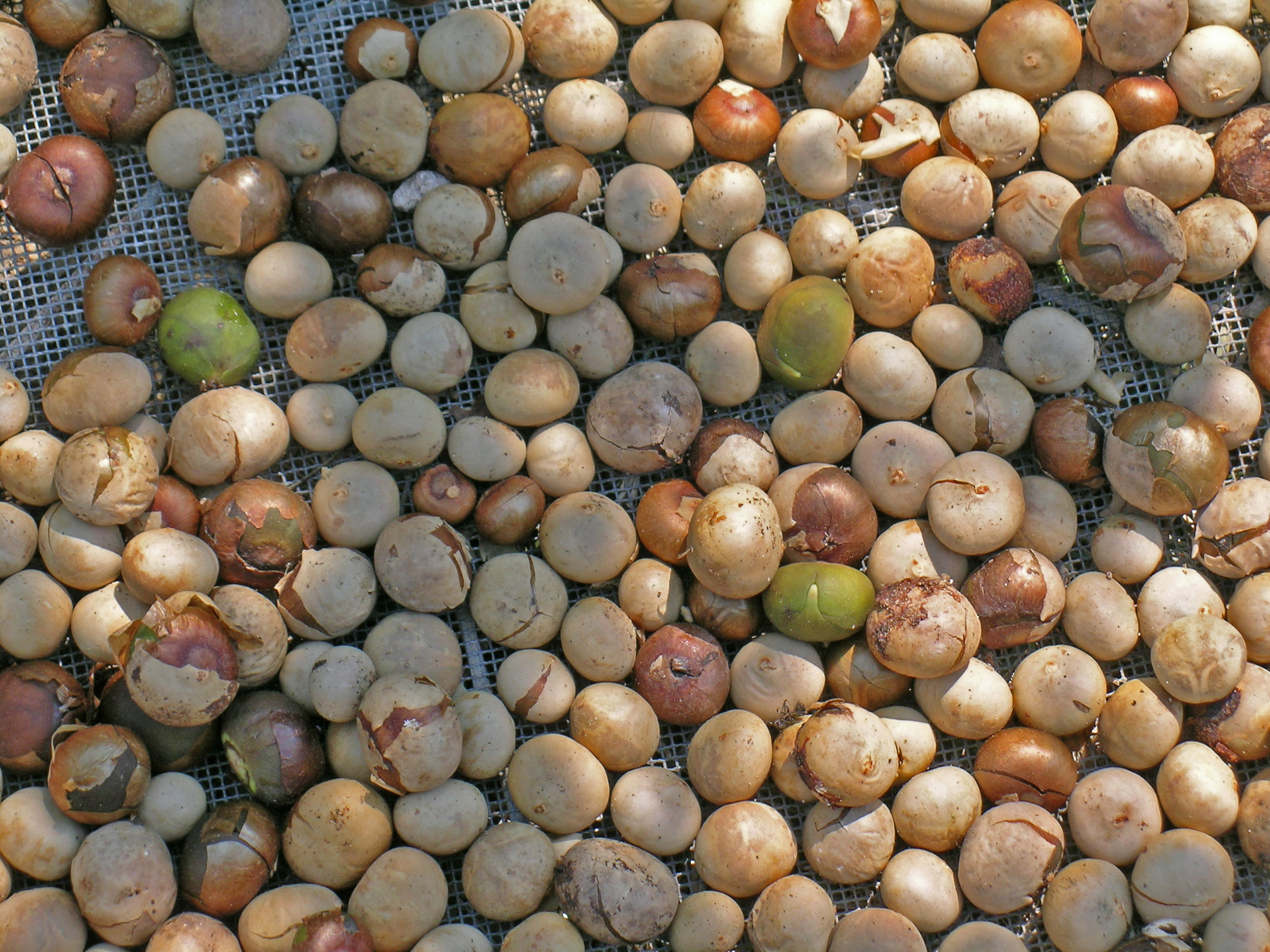
Breadnuts being dried in the sun

Breadnut may have formed a part of the diet of the pre-Columbian Maya of the lowlands region in Mesoamerica, although to what extent has been a matter of some debate among historians and archaeologists: no verified remains or engravings of the fruit have been found at any Mayan archaeological sites.

It has been claimed in several publications by Dennis E. Puleston to have been a staple food in the Maya diet. Puleston demonstrated a strong correlation between ancient Maya settlement patterns and the distribution of relic stands of ramon trees. Other research has downplayed the Maya nut's significance. In the modern era, it has been marginalized as a source of nutrition and has often been characterized as a famine food.

The tree lends its name to the Maya archaeological sites of Iximché and Topoxte, both in Guatemala and Tamuin (reflecting the Maya origin of the Huastec peoples). It is one of the 20 dominant species of the Maya forest. Of the dominant species, it is the only one that is wind-pollinated. It is also found in traditional Maya forest gardens.

A high density of seeds during the seedling offsets a reduced viability of the young plants and therefore enables a good yield. Seed storage is a common issue in seedling production. Long storage adversely affects the germination rate, for example after three weeks it decreases by 10%. Refrigeration is not a solution as it risks killing the seeds.

Breadnut (Brosimum alicastrum), raw
Nutritional value per 100 g (3.5 oz)
- Energy: 908 kJ (217 kcal)
- Carbohydrates: 46.28 g
- Fat: 0.99 g
- Saturated: 0.267 g
- Monounsaturated: 0.126 g
- Polyunsaturated: 0.527 g
- Protein: 5.97 g
Amino acids
Tryptophan	0.162 g
Threonine	0.232 g
Isoleucine	0.338 g
Leucine	0.647 g
Lysine	0.260 g
Methionine	0.035 g
Cystine	0.093 g
Phenylalanine	0.282 g
Tyrosine	0.439 g
Valine	0.578 g
Arginine	0.549 g
Histidine	0.091 g
Alanine	0.271 g
Aspartic acid	0.659 g
Glutamic acid	0.835 g
Glycine	0.375 g
Proline	0.297 g
Serine	0.400 g
Vitamins and minerals
Vitamins	Quantity %DV^{†}
Vitamin A equiv.	1% 12 μg
Thiamine (B1)	5% 0.055 mg
Riboflavin (B2)	4% 0.055 mg
Niacin (B3)	6% 0.880 mg
Pantothenic acid (B5)	22% 1.103 mg
Vitamin B6	24% 0.403 mg
Folate (B9)	17% 66 μg
Vitamin B12	0% 0.00 μg
Vitamin C	30% 27.4 mg
Minerals	Quantity %DV^{†}
Calcium	8% 98 mg
Copper	160% 1.444 mg
Iron	12% 2.09 mg
Magnesium	16% 68 mg
Manganese	8% 0.178 mg
Phosphorus	5% 67 mg
Potassium	39% 1183 mg
Sodium	1% 31 mg
Zinc	10% 1.13 mg
- Other constituents: Quantity
- Water: 45.00 g
- Link to USDA Database entry
- ^{†}Percentages estimated using US recommendations for adults, except for potassium, which is estimated based on expert recommendation from the National Academies.

== Uses ==
The Maya nut is high in fiber, calcium, potassium, iron, zinc, protein and B vitamins. It has a low glycemic index (<50) and is very high in antioxidants and prebiotic fiber. The fresh seeds can be cooked and eaten or can be set out to dry in the sun and roasted and milled into a chocolatey tasting powder. Stewed, the nut tastes like mashed potato; roasted, it tastes like chocolate or coffee. It can be prepared in numerous other dishes. In Petén, Guatemala, the breadnut is cultivated for exportation and local consumption as powder, for hot beverages, and bread.

The large seed is edible and can be boiled or dried and ground into a meal for porridge or flatbread.

=== Other uses ===
Breadnut leaves are commonly used as forage for livestock during the dry season in Central America. The fruits and seeds are also used to feed all kinds of animals.

Brosimum alicastrum can be used for carbon farming as a nut crop or fodder. It is an oxalogene tree. It can therefore undertake a bacterial-fungal endosymbiosis which assists the oxalate-carbonate pathway (OCP) and especially the chemical reaction of biomineralization, and in this case biocalcification (to produce CaCO_{3} from CO_{2} and to store it in the soils). This tree would therefore act as a carbon sink, while providing resources for both humans and animals. This was first shown by a biogeochemist Eric Verrechia, researcher at University of Lausanne in 2006.

The species can be used to restore damaged soils. It can prevent erosion and act as a wind barrier. The tree tolerates poor, damaged, dried or salty soils and it requires few inputs after its planting. Furthermore, its oxalogenic activity increases the pH and the amount of organic matter in the soil once well implemented in the agricultural system. This leads to an increased fertility thanks to a buffer effect. Some research projects are currently on-going to develop this crop in its current distribution area.

== In culture ==
The name "breadnut" probably arose because the seeds can be ground to produce bread. Its Spanish name ramón comes from its discovery by cows eating the nuts off its branches (ramo).

The plant is known by a range of names in indigenous Mesoamerican and other languages, including: capomo, mojo, ox, iximche, masica in Honduras, uje in the state of Michoacan Mexico, mojote in Jalisco, chokogou in Haitian Creole and chataigne in Trinidadian Creole. In the Caribbean coast of Colombia it is called guaímaro or guaymaro.

== See also ==
- Artocarpus camansi, another plant also commonly known as "breadnut"
