= North Bellport, New York =

- Hamlet and census-designated place
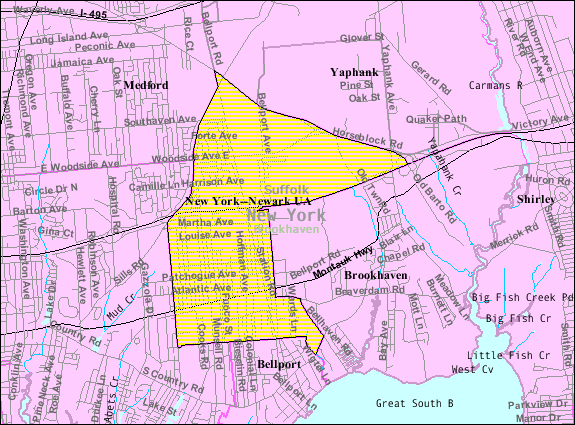
- U.S. Census map of North Bellport.

- Location within the state of New York.
- Coordinates: 40°46′58″N 72°57′7″W
- Country: United States
- State: New York
- County: Suffolk
- Town: Brookhaven

Area
  - Total: 4.91 sq mi (12.71 km^{2})
  - Land: 4.91 sq mi (12.71 km^{2})
  - Water: 0 sq mi (0.00 km^{2})
- Elevation: 46 ft (14 m)

Population (2020)
  - Total: 11,900
  - Density: 2,424.0/sq mi (935.93/km^{2})
- Time zone: UTC−05:00 (Eastern Time Zone)
  - Summer (DST): UTC−04:00
- ZIP Code: 11713
- Area codes: 631, 934
- FIPS code: 36-51528
- GNIS feature ID: 0958685

North Bellport is a hamlet and census-designated place (CDP) located within the Town of Brookhaven, New York, United States. As of the 2020 census, North Bellport had a population of 11,900.

== History ==
North Bellport was built by the Hagerman Land Company, named after the neighboring hamlet of Hagerman. Originally a predominantly white community, North Bellport was blockbusted during the early 1960s, resulting in a major influx of African Americans into the community. In 1962, the community was the subject of first of several notable court cases concerning the practice of blockbusting by real estate agents in New York.

== Geography ==
According to the United States Census Bureau, the CDP has a total area of 4.9 square miles (12.8 km^{2}), all land.

== Demographics ==
Historical population
Census	Pop.	Note	%±
2020	11,900		—
U.S. Decennial Census

=== 2020 census ===
As of the 2020 census, North Bellport had a population of 11,900. The median age was 34.4 years. 24.8% of residents were under the age of 18 and 10.1% of residents were 65 years of age or older. For every 100 females there were 98.0 males, and for every 100 females age 18 and over there were 96.6 males age 18 and over.

100.0% of residents lived in urban areas, while 0.0% lived in rural areas.

There were 3,484 households in North Bellport, of which 41.1% had children under the age of 18 living in them. Of all households, 46.4% were married-couple households, 16.4% were households with a male householder and no spouse or partner present, and 27.1% were households with a female householder and no spouse or partner present. About 15.7% of all households were made up of individuals and 4.8% had someone living alone who was 65 years of age or older.

There were 3,670 housing units, of which 5.1% were vacant. The homeowner vacancy rate was 1.1% and the rental vacancy rate was 4.7%.

Racial composition as of the 2020 census
Race	Number	Percent
White	4,537	38.1%
Black or African American	2,701	22.7%
American Indian and Alaska Native	190	1.6%
Asian	324	2.7%
Native Hawaiian and Other Pacific Islander	11	0.1%
Some other race	2,462	20.7%
Two or more races	1,675	14.1%
Hispanic or Latino (of any race)	4,451	37.4%

=== 2000 census ===
As of the 2000 census, there were 9,007 people, 2,349 households, and 2,036 families residing in the CDP. The population density was 1,937.7 inhabitants per square mile (748.2/km^{2}). There were 2,520 housing units at an average density of 542.1 per square mile (209.3/km^{2}). The racial makeup of the CDP was 15% White, 60% African American, 1.50% Native American, 1.98% Asian, 0.07% Pacific Islander, 7.28% from other races, and 5.14% from two or more races. Hispanic or Latino of any race were 30% of the population.

There were 2,349 households, out of which 49.5% had children under the age of 18 living with them, 57.1% were married couples living together, 23.6% had a female householder with no husband present, and 13.3% were non-families. 8.9% of all households were made up of individuals, and 2.8% had someone living alone who was 65 years of age or older. The average household size was 3.75 and the average family size was 3.91.

In the CDP, the population was spread out, with 33.6% under the age of 18, 10.3% from 18 to 24, 29.6% from 25 to 44, 20.2% from 45 to 64, and 6.4% who were 65 years of age or older. The median age was 30 years. For every 100 females, there were 96.3 males. For every 100 females age 18 and over, there were 91.7 males.

The median income for a household in the CDP was $55,145, and the median income for a family was $56,140. Males had a median income of $38,099 versus $27,939 for females. The per capita income for the CDP was $16,733. About 11.5% of families and 15.5% of the population were below the poverty line, including 22.6% of those under age 18 and 7.4% of those age 65 or over.

== Education ==
=== School district ===
North Bellport is located entirely within the boundaries of the South Country Central School District. As such, all children residing in North Bellport who attend public schools go to South Country's schools.

=== Library district ===
North Bellport is located within the boundaries of the South Country Library District.

== Transportation ==
The Long Island Rail Road's Bellport station on the Montauk Branch is located within the hamlet. North Bellport is also served by Suffolk County Transit buses.
