= Dennis Puleston =

Anglo-American environmentalist (1905–2001)

Dennis Puleston (30 December 1905 – 8 June 2001) was a British-American environmentalist, adventurer, and designer. He is known for playing a key part in securing a nationwide ban in the United States on the use of the pesticide DDT, a decision regarded as the first important success of the emerging environmental movement. As a result of this ban, he helped save his favourite bird, the osprey, from extinction in North America. He was co-founder and the first chairman of the Environmental Defense Fund. Puleston also co-designed the DUKW, an amphibious vehicle used in World War II.

== Early life and adventures ==
Puleston was born near London, and grew up in Leigh-on-Sea in Essex, England. His uncle introduced him to his lifelong interest in ornithology and his artist mother encouraged him to draw. He went on to become a talented wildlife artist. From an early age he was interested in boats and sailing. He studied biology and naval architecture at the University of London, followed by an unsatisfying stint working in a bank. In 1931 he and a friend, with scant funds, set off to sea from England in a small sailing boat, across the Atlantic, and spent the next six years sailing around the world. One obituary recorded:

On his travels, he ate human flesh with cannibals in New Guinea, flirted with virgins in Samoa, managed a derelict coconut plantation in the Virgin islands, adopted a pet boa constrictor, tattooed his arm with sharks' teeth, searched for sunken treasure off Santo Domingo, was shipwrecked on Cape Hatteras and gave his pet cockatoo to the Emperor of Japan. Eventually he was captured in China by Japanese soldiers fighting the Sino-Japanese war. When Puleston received a handwritten letter from the Emperor thanking him for the cockatoo, his captors were so impressed that they packed him back to Europe on the Trans-Siberian railway.

He wrote about his adventures in his first book, Blue Water Vagabond: Six Years' Adventure at Sea, published in 1939. By that same year Puleston had moved to the United States, and in 1942 he took American citizenship.

== Wartime career ==
In 1942 Puleston was asked by the US Government to join the Office of Scientific Research and Development. With his background in naval architecture he helped to develop the DUKW, commonly called "the duck", the Army's amphibious landing vehicle used in the Normandy landings and throughout the Mediterranean, and in the Pacific, including at Iwo Jima and Okinawa.

Puleston was sent to the Pacific, where he trained American forces on the craft, and then organised a training school in its use for the British in India. He took part in amphibious operations in the Solomon Islands, New Guinea and latterly Burma, where he was badly wounded by shrapnel in a Japanese attack. After recuperating, he trained allied forces in Britain in preparation for the Normandy landings. He then returned to the Pacific to organise a DUKW training school on Oahu and take part in the invasion of Iwo Jima and Okinawa. In recognition of his work in designing the DUKW, he was awarded the Medal of Freedom by President Harry S. Truman in 1948.

== Environmental work ==
After the war, Puleston was appointed Director of Technical Information at Brookhaven National Laboratory on Long Island. A keen ornithologist since childhood, Puleston was happy to watch the ospreys that came to the island every year. On his arrival at Long Island in 1948 he wrote "they were everywhere, repairing their huge stick nests on dead trees, utility poles and platforms erected especially for them. They even nested in the middle of towns and raised chicks right along the highways, oblivious to traffic." They bred so successfully that on a 1948 visit to the nearby Gardiners Island wildlife reserve he counted some 300 nests, with an average of more than two chicks fledging from each active nest.

Puleston began keeping records of the nests on Gardiners Island and their reproductive history, and over several years a dramatic fall in the number of active nests and chicks became apparent. Investigating further, he found that the eggs in the nests had been dented and crushed by the weight of the parent birds as they incubated the eggs.

In 1962 the landmark book Silent Spring by Rachel Carson had been published. The book discussed the detrimental effects of pesticides on the environment, particularly on birds. Carson said that DDT had been found to cause thinner egg shells, reproductive problems and ultimately the death of birds.

Puleston tested eggs that had failed to hatch at Brookhaven National Laboratory, where he worked. High concentrations of DDT residues were found in the eggs, with scientists concluding that the pesticide must interfere with the female osprey's ability to produce normal eggshells. "Using DDT to control mosquitos was like torpedoing the QEII to get rid of the rats on board", Puleston wrote.

The Suffolk County Mosquito Control Commission regularly sprayed the Long Island countryside with DDT, and refused to accept evidence that this was having any deleterious effect on ospreys and other wildlife. By 1966, there were fewer than 50 active nests on Gardiners Island, with only four chicks in total. It became clear that unless urgent action was taken, the osprey would no longer breed in the Long Island area. That same year, Puleston and a group of others filed a class action in the New York State Supreme Court to force the Commission to stop using DDT.

Puleston presented the court with seven watercolours that he had painted to illustrate how DDT was destroying the food chain of the local wildlife. One showed how the blue-claw crab ingested DDT from the mussels it ate. The judge remarked "So that's why there are no more crabs in Great South Bay." The case convinced the Suffolk County Legislature to ban DDT.

The following year, 1967, Puleston and his colleagues founded the Environmental Defense Fund (EDF) and Puleston became its first chairman, a position he held for five years. The EDF went on to win further bans in other states and finally, its goal of a nationwide ban in 1972. It subsequently became one of the largest environmental organisations in America.

As Puleston and his colleagues had hoped, as the amount of DDT residues in the environment dropped, osprey numbers on Long Island began to recover. By 1992, there were 226 nests on the island and more than 60 on Gardiners Island with 260 fledged chicks. Other species including bald eagles, peregrine falcons and dozens of fish species have also seen a substantial recovery since the DDT ban was imposed.

Puleston retired from Brookhaven National Laboratory in 1970. He subsequently made more than 200 trips around the world as a lecturer, and acted as senior naturalist on two scientific expeditions to the Siberian Arctic. In his later years, Puleston concentrated on painting and writing about Long Island wildlife. He also was a bird bander in Brookhaven, New York. In 1993 he published a month by month guide called A Nature Journal, which became a best seller.

The "Dennis Puleston Osprey Fund" was set up in his memory by his family and friends.

== Personal life ==
Puleston married his wife Elizabeth Ann ("Betty") Wellington of Brookhaven, New York on February 2, 1939. They had two sons and two daughters: Dennis (1940), Jennifer (1943), Peter (1946), and Sally (1949). The eldest son, Dennis E. Puleston, was a noted archaeologist.

== Publications ==
- 1939 Blue Water Vagabond: Six Years' Adventure at Sea Doubleday
- 1992 A Nature Journal: A Naturalist's Year on Long Island W. W. Norton & Co Inc.
- 1996 The Gull's Way: A Sailor-Naturalist's Yarn Vantage
