= Dennis E. Puleston =

American archaeologist and ecologist (1940–1978)

- Born: June 19, 1940; Long Island, New York
- Died: June 29, 1978 (aged 38); El Castillo, Chichen Itza
- Education: Bellport High School, Antioch College, University of Pennsylvania
- Known for: Research on chultuns
- Scientific career
- Fields: Archaeology, Ecology

Dennis E. Puleston, Ph.D. (June 19, 1940 – June 29, 1978) was an American archaeologist and ecologist. His work involved pioneering interdisciplinary methods which remain current to this day and led to a greater emphasis upon ecological and experimental archaeological research in the 1980s and 1990s. Puleston's work ranged from experiments in the reconstruction and usefulness testing of chultuns or raised fields, building a traditional dugout canoe and using it to investigate otherwise unreachable areas, and challenging the belief that the Maya civilization subsisted on a milpa agricultural system of maize, beans, and squash.

== Life and career ==
Puleston was born on Long Island, to Dennis Puleston, a noted ornithologist, sailor, explorer, painter, and environmentalist, and Elizabeth Rhode Puleston. He had one brother, Peter, and two sisters, Sally and Jennifer.

Puleston attended high school at Bellport High School, in Brookhaven, New York, and upon graduating, collaborated with the National Film Board of Canada in the creation of a cinematic study of tundras before studying biology at Antioch College. He also worked with Roland Force and Paul Schultz Martin in 1960 as a student assistant at the Chicago Natural History Museum.

As a graduate student at the University of Pennsylvania, Puleston met and married Olga Stavrakis. Puleston and Stavrakis had a son, Cedric, and a daughter, Lyda. Puleston's family would accompany him in many of his archaeological excavations.

Puleston's career was intimately tied to Tikal. Originally invited to join the Tikal Project in 1961 by Edwin Shook, the project director, Puleston entered graduate school at the University of Pennsylvania Museum in 1964, continuing his work at Tikal under the direction of William Coe. Puleston became interested in how the ordinary Tikal citizen lived and focused his research on population and subsistence asking questions about how the Classic Maya managed their environment in such a way that it could feed large populations without degrading the delicate ecological balance of the subtropical forest.

At the time, archaeological research focused on the central mapped area of Tikal, representing the urban and ceremonial core of the polity. Puleston began to explore the surrounding jungle in order to learn where settlement dropped off and the agricultural area began. Up until that time, few archaeologists ventured regularly into the jungle and many of the smaller sites mapped today remained unknown. Puleston searched for the city limits to try to determine the site and, ultimately, the population of Tikal and to this end he began exploring and mapping the smaller sites outside the city center. He then developed a major research program, called the Sustaining Area Project, which mapped four 12 km strips extending out from the center of Tikal.

Using a compass and pace method for the mapping he and his research teams were able to quickly and accurately cover large areas of dense jungle within which they discovered a number of previously unknown small sites, causeways, an enormous earthworks north of Tikal and hundreds of housemounds and residential platforms. Based on this work, Puleston proposed a new population estimate for Tikal of at least 80,000 inhabitants within the boundaries defined by the earthworks and by drops in population density. He suggested that the earthworks may have served as defensive fortifications (the first discovered in the Maya Lowlands at that time) and probably the northern urban border of the site. He studied caves and sacred writing to expand knowledge on the spiritual beliefs of the ancient Maya. He developed several important hypotheses on Maya subsistence and agriculture that are discussed below.

Puleston died in 1978, struck by lightning while viewing a thunderstorm from the summit of El Castillo, Chichen Itza in Yucatan, Mexico.

== Approach to archaeology ==
Unlike several of Puleston's contemporaries, who were concerned with human interactions with nature–cultural ecology, Puleston's approach involved juxtaposing the micro and macro perspectives of these environments into one coherent argument. Traditional archaeological methods are based on theory interpreted through anthropological observations and repetition of artifactual data from site to site. However, he decided to test many of his theories through experiments in the environment. A wave of such approaches was evident in the aftermath of Puleston's death, as evident in the book, Maya Subsistence: A Tribute to Dennis E. Puleston and in the recordings of the proceedings of Puleston's memorial conference entitled "The History and Development of Maya Subsistence", which was held in October 1979 in Minneapolis. Arguments of environmental change since the 8th and 9th century decline of Lowland Maya societies unpopularized his version of experimental archaeology to the point that it is now rarely practiced.

== Research into chultuns ==
Chultuns are human-made holes in the ground and are found in many parts of Mesoamerica. They come in several forms, but they are all called by the same moniker. In 1971, Puleston wrote an article entitled "An Experimental Approach to the Function of Classic Maya Chultuns". Within this article, he shows that, despite the common name, there are several different types of chultuns and he suggests that these different styles were indicative of differing uses. In this article, he asserted that while the first chultuns documented where single chambers with plastered walls for holding and collecting water, the chultuns in the Tikal region were different in shape, not plastered, and did not hold water.

Puleston conducted three experiments to test the chultuns. First, he filled a chultun with water and watched it drain away quickly. This lent credibility to his assertion that chultuns of this region were not for water storage. Next, Puleston built a chultun. To do so he created stone tools similar to those that would have been used to construct one 1,000 years ago. Upon completion, in 1966, Puleston filled the chultun with a diversity of locally produced dietary contributions, like maize, beans, squash, and cassava. Every two weeks, Puleston would pull the items out and document their state of preservation. These items were weighed, examined, and photographed. The observations were then compared to a control group that was stored above ground. However, the control group was quickly consumed by rodents and insects. While the chultun-stored produce was not consumed, the end products were also not consumable. Upon completion of this 11-week experiment, Puleston (1971) noted that, “while the chultun apparently offered valuable protection from vermin, it evidently could not be used for the storage of maize, beans, or squash”. The following year Puleston tried the experiment once more, but this time he added a nut from a local tree – the Brosium alicastrum (ramon) to the mix. O.F. Cook (1935) is cited in Puleston's article as the originator of the idea that chultuns could have been used to store ramon nuts, however, without Puleston's experiment this assertion had never been taken seriously. What Puleston found changed many archaeologists' opinion of the ramon's utility and its possible utilization in ancient Maya society. Not only did the ramon nuts survive the 13-week experiment that once again devastated the comparable crops, after 13 months, ”they were still in excellent condition and completely edible”. Puleston drew on these experiments for further work on the ramon as an alternative staple in the Maya diet. The resultant argument can be seen in a number of the linked articles below, and a synopsis of his findings is included below.

== Legacy ==
Puleston was instrumental in the wave of investigation of subsistence ecology that followed his demise. A book, Maya Subsistence: Studies in Memory of Dennis E. Puleston, was written in dedication to Puleston and his passion. Many of Puleston's friends and colleagues contributed to this book. While there is a dwindling amount of study on ecological aspects of archaeology and even less utilization of experimental archaeology in the field today, there are some who remain dedicated to the pursuit of these answers and for many modern applied and/or experimental archaeologists, Puleston is an inspiration.

In 2015, British Archaeological Reports published a collection of Puleston's field work, edited and revised by Olga Stavrakis-Puleston. This volume represents the only full report of Puleston's Tikal survey and also covers several related sub-projects, including excavations of Tikal satellite sites.
