= Environmental Defense Fund =

US-based nonprofit environmental organization

- Founded: 1967; 59 years ago
- Type: Non-profit
- Purpose: Environmentalism
- Location: New York, New York, United States
- Region served: Worldwide
- Method: Science, economic incentives, partnerships, nonpartisan police
- Members: 3,500,000+ (2025)
- Revenue: US$312,900,000 (2024)
- Staff: 1000+ (2025)
- Website: www.edf.org

Environmental Defense Fund or EDF (formerly known as Environmental Defense) is a nonprofit United States–based environmental advocacy group. The group is known for its work on global warming, ecosystem restoration, oceans, and human health. It advocates using science, economics, and law to find environmental solutions that work. EDF is nonpartisan.

Headquartered in New York City, the group has offices across the US, and employs scientists and policy specialists worldwide.

Fred Krupp has served as its president since 1984. In May 2011, Krupp was among a group of experts appointed by the US Department of Energy who were charged with making recommendations to improve the safety and environmental performance of fracking from shale formations.

The organization was ranked first among environmental groups in a 2007 Financial Times global study of 850 business-nonprofit partnerships. Charity Navigator, an independent charity evaluator, has given EDF a four-out-of-four stars rating since 2012.

== History ==
The organization's founders, including Art Cooley, Robert Burnap, George Woodwell, Charles Wurster, Dennis Puleston, Victor Yannacone and Robert Smolker, discovered in the mid-1960s that the osprey and other large raptors were rapidly disappearing. Their research uncovered a link between the spraying of DDT to kill mosquitoes and the thinning of egg shells of large birds, research related to the book Silent Spring by Rachel Carson about the dangers of DDT and the effects that it had on birds, published in 1962. Carson, who died in 1964, is noted as the scientist who inspired the environmental movement. The founders of EDF successfully sought a ban on DDT in Suffolk County, Long Island, New York. Next, they succeeded in banning DDT statewide, then took their efforts nationally.

In looking back at passage of the Safe Drinking Water Act of 1974, top EPA officials responsible for implementing the law recall that EDF published a statistical study that supported a link between organic contaminants and cancer rates in the City of New Orleans, a study that received a tremendous amount of media attention and contributed to the enactment of the law.

On April 11, 2018, the group announced plans for MethaneSAT, a satellite to help identify global methane emissions, concentrating on the 50 major oil and gas regions responsible for 80% of methane production. The satellite launched on March 4, 2024. EDF says it will make the data public. The goal is to help reduce methane emissions by 45% by 2025. Funding for the project comes from The Audacious Project, an initiative of the worldwide TED conference group.

== Areas of work ==
- Corporate partnerships – EDF receives millions in funding from organizations with strong corporate ties, such as the Walton Family Foundation (Walmart).
- Environmental economics – The organization promotes the use of markets and incentives to help solve environmental problems. Examples of this approach at work include catch shares the cap-and-trade plan written into the Clean Air Act (United States).

== Key accomplishments ==
Key accomplishments of Environmental Defense Fund include:

- 1967 – A group of scientists forms the organization and sets out to ban DDT (succeeding in 1972). (See DDT ban.)
- 1970 – Efforts to ban whale hunting.
- 1974 – An Environmental Defense Fund report on potential health risks of Mississippi River water based on EPA analytical studies helps pass the Safe Drinking Water Act, establishing the first comprehensive health standards for water nationwide.
- 1985 – Helped convince federal regulators to phase out lead from gasoline, leading to a dramatic decline in childhood lead poisoning.
- 1986 – Pushed McDonald's to institute biodegradable food-packaging containers.
- 1987 – Played a key role in the treaty to phase out the use of CFCs, chemicals that many researchers believe damage the Earth's ozone layer, although CFC-22 was continued to be allowed, renamed H-CFC-22 to avoid banning.
- 1990 – Designed Title IV of the Clean Air Act, which incorporates market-based methods to cut air pollution and acid rain. The measures reduced sulfur dioxide pollution faster than expected, and at a fraction of the cost.
- 1990 – Improved McDonald's packaging, reducing solid waste in a groundbreaking corporate partnership, which came after dozens of other groups had protested McDonald's use of styrofoam packaging and the corporation was looking for a way to "save face" by claiming EDF's advocacy was the reason for the shift. The Citizens Clearinghouse on Hazardous Waste, founded by Lois Gibbs, helped coordinate the protests of McDonald's.
- 1993 – EDF was one of seven foundation-funded environmental groups to endorse the NAFTA Treaty.
- 1995 – Designed the Safe Harbor plan that gives landowners new incentives to help endangered species on their property.
- 2000 – Seven of the world's largest corporations join Environmental Defense in a partnership to address global warming, setting firm targets to reduce their greenhouse gas emissions.
- 2001, 2004, 2008 – Won measures resulting in cleaner vehicle exhaust from trucks, ships and other vehicles.
- 2002 – Initiated the campaign to remove the O'Shaughnessy Dam in Hetch Hetchy Valley in Yosemite National Park.
- 2004 – Culmination of four-year partnership with FedEx to develop and deploy hybrid electric trucks. The new vehicles cut smog-forming pollution by 65%, reduce soot by 96%, and move 57% farther on a gallon of fuel.
- 2006 – Co-authored the California Global Warming Solutions Act of 2006 with Natural Resources Defense Council.
- 2006 – Led adoption of catch shares, a science-based method to manage fishing and control fish population decline.
- 2007 – Co-founded United States Climate Action Partnership (US-CAP), a coalition of major corporations and environmental groups supporting action on global warming, including a market-based carbon emissions cap. Corporate participants include GE, DuPont and Duke Energy; non-profit groups involved are Pew Center on Global Climate Change, Natural Resources Defense Council and the World Resources Institute, a co-founder.
- 2007 – Helped negotiate an environmental codicil as part of Texas Pacific's buyout of TXU.
- 2008–2011 – Founded and developed the Climate Corps program, which matches organizations with MBA and MPA students to uncover energy savings.
- 2011 – Successful campaign to clean up highly-polluting heating oil in New York City.
- 2011 – Built coalition to defeat Proposition 23, an industry-backed ballot initiative that would have blocked California's Global Warming Solutions Act (AB32).

== Criticism ==
EDF has drawn criticism for its ties to large corporations including McDonald's, FedEx, Walmart, and the Texas energy company TXU, with which the organization has negotiated to reduce emissions and develop more environmentally friendly business practices. EDF's philosophy is that it is willing to talk with big business and try new approaches in order to get environmental results.

=== Fisheries conservation ===
A 2009 op-ed piece by the Pacific Coast Federation of Fisherman's Association in the trade journal Fishermen's News argues that EDF's approach to fisheries policy in the Pacific Northwest is likely to damage smaller, local operators who have an interest in protecting fisheries and limiting by-catch. Many fishermen fear that the approach gives a competitive advantage to larger, non-local operations, jeopardizing independent operators, including boats, fisheries, and ports.

EDF has argued that the way we manage our fisheries needs to change if we want to protect fishermen, fish, and coastal communities. In a report suggesting economic waste in some of the world's commercial fisheries, EDF advocates an approach: catch shares, which sets a scientifically based limit on the total amount of fish that can be caught; that amount is then divided among individuals or groups, who can sell their shares or lease them to fishermen. EDF has suggested that concern about consolidation or corporate ownership of fisheries is unwarranted.

EDF has been accused of funding and disseminating studies that utilize questionable science and economics in their promotion of catch share fishery management. Also, they have employed substantial political lobbying to promote fisheries policies that tend to force out smaller fishing businesses in favor of consolidated, corporate owned fleets, while denying any adverse effects these programs have on fishing families and communities.

EDF has held meetings with private investors where their West Coast vice president, David Festa, promoted the purchase of fishing rights as an investment that can yield 400% profits, and "options value" despite its claims that these rights are designed to provide financial incentives for the fishermen themselves. Multiple non-profit organizations have expressed repeated frustrations with EDF and its promotion of these management policies. Recent studies show that despite EDF's claims, catch shares do not end overfishing and typically result in no long-term environmental gains.

The Environmental Defense Fund supports the Rigs-to-Reefs program in the Gulf of Mexico, in which former offshore oil production platforms are converted to permanent artificial reefs. The EDF sees the program as a way to preserve the existing reef habitat of the oil platforms.

=== Natural gas ===
EDF sees natural gas as a way to quickly replace coal, with the idea that gas in time will be replaced by renewable energy. The organization presses for stricter environmental controls on gas drilling and hydraulic fracturing, without banning them. In November 2013, after negotiations with the oil industry, EDF representatives joined spokesmen for Anadarko Petroleum, Noble Energy, and Encana, to endorse Colorado governor John Hickenlooper's proposed tighter regulation of emissions of volatile organic compounds by oil and gas production. EDF has funded studies jointly with the petroleum industry on the environmental effects of natural gas production. The policy has been criticized by some environmentalists. EDF counsel and blogger Mark Brownstein answered: "We fear that those who oppose all natural gas production everywhere are, in effect, making it harder for the U.S. economy to wean itself from dirty coal."

Partners in academic grants have included Chevron, Shell, and Exxon Mobil subsidiaries. Resulting studies have reported levels of fugitive emissions for natural gas production that are lower than estimates used by the EPA. In one study, a connection is drawn between increasing prevalence in hydraulic fracturing and a decrease in fugitive emissions over a two-decade period. Work in this area is directed towards policymakers and intended to “better inform and advance national and international scientific and policy discussions with respect to natural gas development and use.”

== See also ==
- Sustainability
- Biodiversity
- Global warming
- Recycling
- Ecology
- Earth Science
- Natural environment
- Natural landscape
- Massachusetts v. Environmental Protection Agency
- Environmental history of the United States
