= Brookhaven (CDP), New York =

Brookhaven, New York
- Hamlet and census-designated place
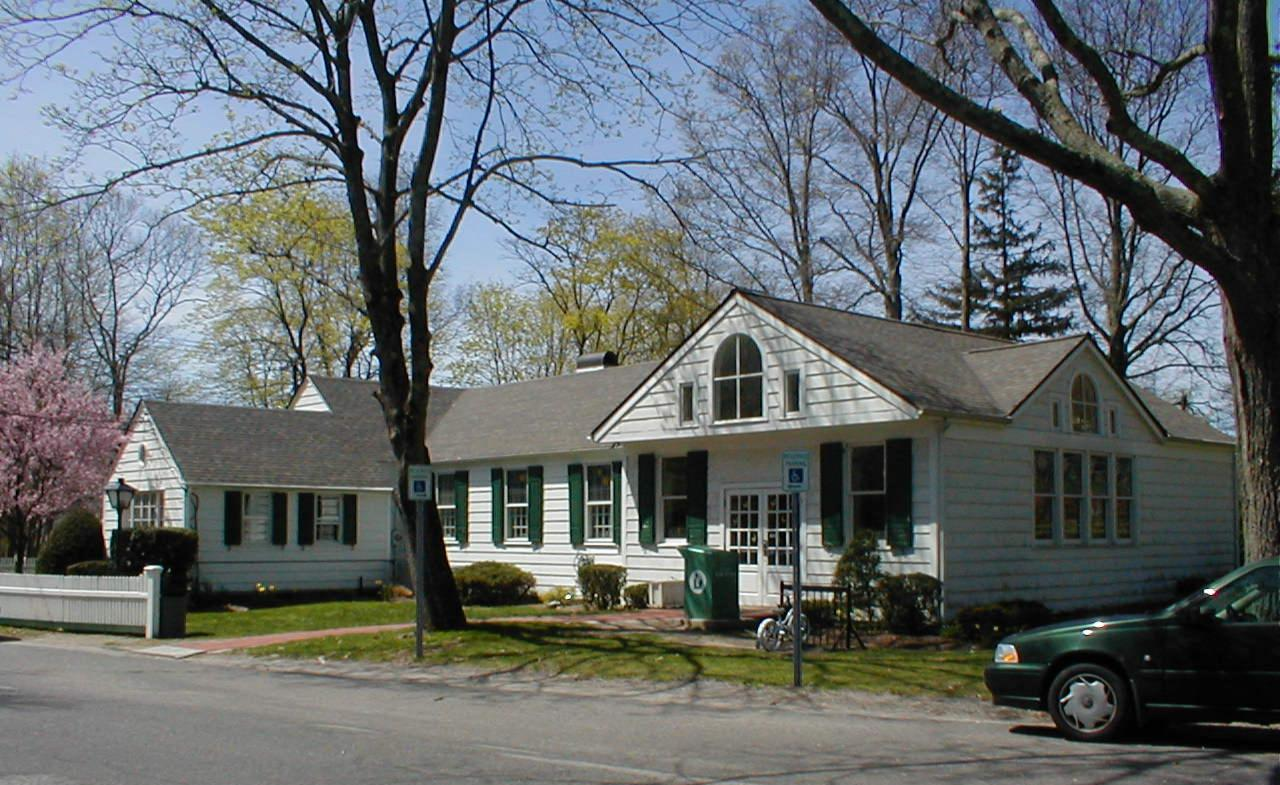
- Brookhaven Free Library on the northwest corner of Beaver Dam Road and Library Lane.

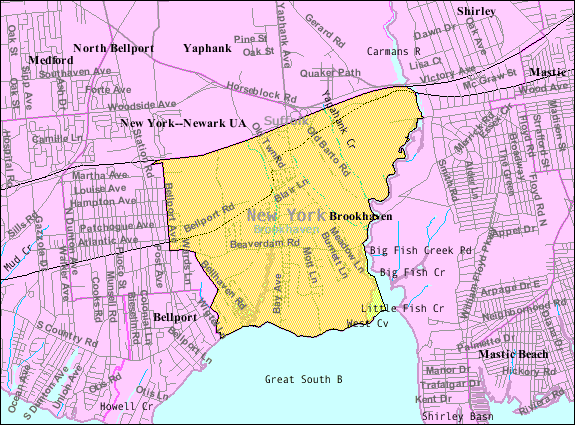
- U.S. Census map

- Location within the state of New York
- Coordinates: 40°46′33″N 72°55′5″W
- Country: United States
- State: New York
- County: Suffolk
- Town: Brookhaven

Area
  - Total: 5.94 sq mi (15.38 km^{2})
  - Land: 5.80 sq mi (15.01 km^{2})
  - Water: 0.14 sq mi (0.36 km^{2})
- Elevation: 9.8 ft (3 m)

Population (2020)
  - Total: 3,330
  - Density: 574.4/sq mi (221.79/km^{2})
- Time zone: UTC−05:00 (Eastern Time Zone)
  - Summer (DST): UTC−04:00
- ZIP Code: 11719
- Area codes: 631, 934
- FIPS code: 36-09000
- GNIS feature ID: 0944835

Brookhaven is a hamlet and census-designated place in Brookhaven Town, Suffolk County, New York, United States. The population was 3,451 at the 2010 census.

== Geography ==
According to the United States Census Bureau, the CDP has a total area of 5.9 square miles (15.3 km^{2}), of which 5.8 square miles (14.9 km^{2}) is land and 0.15 square miles (0.4 km^{2}), or 2.47%, is water.

== Demographics ==
Historical population
Census	Pop.	Note	%±
2020	3,330		—
U.S. Decennial Census

As of the census of 2000, there were 3,570 people, 1,101 households, and 833 families residing in the CDP. The population density was 590.3 inhabitants per square mile (227.9/km^{2}). There were 1,167 housing units at an average density of 193.0 per square mile (74.5/km^{2}). The racial makeup of the CDP was 84.99% White, 10.11% Black or African American, 0.25% Native American, 0.64% Asian, 0.03% Pacific Islander, 1.34% from other races, and 2.63% from two or more races. Hispanic or Latino of any race were 6.39% of the population.

There were 1,101 households, out of which 34.3% had children under the age of 18 living with them, 61.0% were married couples living together, 10.5% had a female householder with no husband present, and 24.3% were non-families. 17.3% of all households were made up of individuals, and 4.0% had someone living alone who was 65 years of age or older. The average household size was 2.76 and the average family size was 3.13.

In the CDP, the population was spread out, with 25.2% under the age of 18, 6.4% from 18 to 24, 26.4% from 25 to 44, 26.7% from 45 to 64, and 15.2% who were 65 years of age or older. The median age was 39 years. For every 100 females, there were 88.7 males. For every 100 females age 18 and over, there were 86.3 males.

The median income for a household in the CDP was $70,357, and the median income for a family was $80,863. Males had a median income of $49,886 versus $33,611 for females. The per capita income for the CDP was $27,044. About 5.8% of families and 11.5% of the population were below the poverty threshold, including 14.2% of those under age 18 and 2.3% of those age 65 or over.
