= Victor Yannacone =

American lawyer

Victor John Yannacone (born March 10, 1936) is an environmental attorney, who played a role in campaigns to ban the use of DDT, preserve the Florissant fossil beds, and obtain benefits from the Veterans Administration and the chemical company war contractors for the Vietnam combat veterans exposed to dioxin contaminated Agent Orange herbicides.

Since the DDT litigation in 1969, he has been associated with the motto "sue the bastards."

== Early legal career ==
Yannacone was admitted to the New York State Bar in October, 1959 and immediately began his career as a trial lawyer. In addition to trying workers compensation claims for injured workers and the victims of occupational diseases, he began to try personal-injury liability cases in the New York State Supreme Court and represent indigent criminal defendants referred by the NAACP and Court “pro bono.”

In January, 1971, Yannacone and his father Victor J Yannacone established Yannacone & Yannacone, Professional Corporation. Hsi father in 1980, and he continues the firm as a solo practitioner, advocate, trial lawyer, and litigator.

== Patents and inventions ==
Yannacone has contributed to inventions and been awarded patents in dynamic infrared medical imaging: "System and method for identifying and classifying dynamic thermodynamic processes in mammals and discriminating between and among such processes: The Method of Integrals” US 7,408,156 and “Method and apparatus for high resolution dynamic digital infrared imaging: The Differential Method;“ and communications and data mining: “Collection and Distribution of Maritime Data," US 7,286,914, and "System and Method for Dynamic Data Mining", US 8,332,087,

In 1979, during the Agent Orange litigation, Yannacone and his wife Carol A. Yannacone designed and helped build three relational databases — CHAOS (Case histories of Agent Orange Survivors), HOSPIT (Helpless Overmedicated Sick People In Trouble) and DOOM (Doctors Orders and Other Mistakes) — and a minicomputer based object oriented database management system (OODBMS). The relational database management system permitted rapid searching, sorting, and collecting data on individual veterans and associated their service in Southeast Asia at particular places, dates, and times with their individual physiological injuries and disease.

== Personal life ==
Yannacone married Carol Annia Meyer on December 23, 1958 while she was working in the Medical Physics Department of Brookhaven National Laboratory. They have two children.
