= Allegations of CIA assistance to Osama bin Laden =

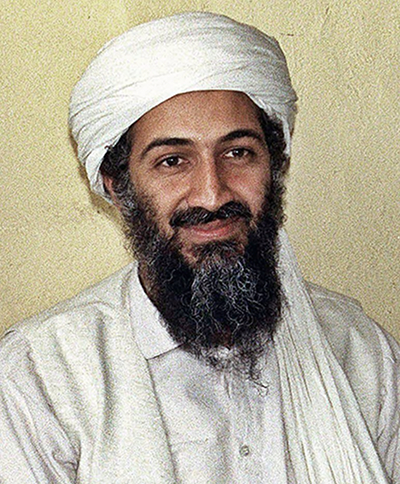
Bin Laden c. 1997–1998

Several sources have alleged that the Central Intelligence Agency (CIA) had ties with Osama bin Laden's faction of "Afghan Arab" fighters when it armed Mujahideen groups to fight the Soviet Union during the Soviet–Afghan War.

About the same time as the 1979 Soviet invasion of Afghanistan, the United States began collaborating with Pakistan's Inter-Services Intelligence (ISI) to provide several hundred million dollars a year in aid to the Afghan Mujahideen insurgents fighting the Afghan pro-Soviet government and the Soviet Army in Operation Cyclone. Along with native Afghan mujahideen were Muslim volunteers from other countries, popularly known as "Afghan Arabs". The most famous of the Afghan Arabs was Osama bin Laden, known at the time as a wealthy and pious Saudi who provided his own money and helped raise millions from other wealthy Persian Gulf Arabs.

When the war ended, bin Laden organized the al-Qaeda organization to carry on armed jihad against other countries, primarily against the United States.

A number of analysts, journalists, and government officials have described Al-Qaeda attacks as "blowback" or an unintended consequence of American aid to the mujahideen. In response, the United States government, U.S. government officials involved in the operation, as well as several journalists and academics have denied this theory. They maintain the aid was given out by the Pakistani ISI, that it went to Afghan and not foreign mujahideen, and that there was no contact between the Afghan Arabs (foreign mujahideen) and the CIA and other American officials, let alone the arming, training, coaching, or indoctrination. Declassified U.S. government documents contain no record of direct contact between the CIA and bin Laden.

On the other hand, several other journalists and academics have documented that bin Laden and the Afghan Arabs at least informally cooperated with the ISI, thus indirectly benefiting from the CIA's funding. According to bin Laden himself, Arab volunteers recruited at his Pakistani-based camp underwent training led by Pakistani and American officers, with the weapons provided by the U.S. and funds provided by Saudi Arabia, however elsewhere bin Laden would deny ever witnessing American aid, affirming only that American-provided weapons reached mujahideen through Pakistan. Bin Laden's key Afghan allies during the war—Jalaluddin Haqqani and Gulbuddin Hekmatyar—were some of the CIA's greatest beneficiaries, with Haqqani being backed directly by the CIA (without ISI mediation), while simultaneously contributing to the formation and growth of bin Laden's group. The CIA backed an ISI initiative to recruit and train foreign mujahideen from around the globe, funded Islamic charitable organizations which recruited foreign mujahideen, and at one point even contemplated the formation of an "international brigade" composed of Afghan Arabs.

== Allegations ==
In a 2004 article entitled "Al-Qaeda's origins and links", the BBC wrote that "[d]uring the anti-Soviet war Bin Laden and his fighters received American and Saudi funding. Some analysts believe Bin Laden himself had security training from the CIA.

In an article in The Guardian, Robin Cook, the British Foreign Secretary from 1997 to 2001, stated that:

Bin Laden was, though, a product of a monumental miscalculation by western security agencies. Throughout the 80s he was armed by the CIA and funded by the Saudis to wage jihad against the Russian occupation of Afghanistan. Al-Qaida, literally "the database", was originally the computer file of the thousands of mujahideen who were recruited and trained with help from the CIA to defeat the Russians.

According to journalist Ahmed Rashid, in 1986 bin Laden "helped build the Khost tunnel complex, which the CIA was funding as a major arms storage depot, training facility and medical centre for the Mujahideen." Although bin Laden claimed that "the [Americans] had no mentionable role" and "are lying when they say that they cooperated with us" during the Soviet–Afghan War, in a 1995 interview bin Laden himself stated that:

To counter these atheist Russians, the Saudis chose me as their representative in Afghanistan, [...] I settled in Pakistan in the Afghan border region. There I received volunteers who came from the Saudi Kingdom and from all over the Arab and Muslim countries. I set up my first camp where these volunteers were trained by Pakistani and American officers. The weapons were supplied by the Americans, the money by the Saudis.

In The New Jackals, British journalist Simon Reeve, quoting a "senior Pakistani intelligence source and a former CIA official," wrote that "[US agents] armed [bin Laden's] men by letting him pay rock-bottom prices for basic weapons," and that "American emissaries are understood to have traveled to Pakistan for meetings with mujahideen leaders... [A former CIA official] even suggests the US emissaries met directly with bin Laden, and that it was bin Laden, acting on advice from his friends in Saudi intelligence, who first suggested the mujahideen should be given Stingers."

Before the formation of al-Qaeda in 1988, bin Laden (among others) ran a precursor organization known as Maktab al-Khidamat (MAK), investigative reporter Joseph Trento wrote, citing a "former CIA officer who actually filed these reports," that "CIA money was actually funneled to MAK, since it was recruiting young Muslim men to come join the jihad in Afghanistan." Likewise, NBC News's Michael Moran states that "the MAK was nurtured by Pakistan's state security services, the Inter-Services Intelligence agency, or ISI, the CIA's primary conduit for conducting the covert war against Moscow's occupation."

Michael Springmann, a consular officer at the US Consulate in Jeddah, Saudi Arabia from 1987 to 1989, stated that he issued more than a hundred visas to unqualified applicants after pressure from his superiors in the State Department, stating to have learned that the visas went to militants recruited by the CIA and bin Laden for training.

In conversation with former British Defence Secretary Michael Portillo, two-time prime minister of Pakistan Benazir Bhutto said Osama bin Laden was initially pro-American. Prince Bandar bin Sultan of Saudi Arabia, has also stated that bin Laden once expressed appreciation for the United States' help in Afghanistan. On CNN's Larry King program he said:

Bandar bin Sultan: This is ironic. In the mid-'80s, if you remember, we and the United - Saudi Arabia and the United States were supporting the Mujahideen to liberate Afghanistan from the Soviets. He [Osama bin Laden] came to thank me for my efforts to bring the Americans, our friends, to help us against the atheists, he said the communists. Isn't it ironic?

Larry King: How ironic. In other words, he came to thank you for helping bring America to help him.

Bandar bin Sultan: Right.

== Opposing view ==
U.S. government officials and a number of other parties maintain that the U.S. supported only the indigenous Afghan mujahideen. They deny that the CIA or other American officials had contact with Bin Laden, let alone armed, trained, coached, or indoctrinated him. American analysts and reporters have called the idea of a CIA-backed Al Qaeda "nonsense", "sheer fantasy", and a "common myth".

According to Peter Bergen, "there is simply no evidence for the common myth that bin Laden and his Afghan Arabs were supported by the CIA financially. Nor is there any evidence that CIA officials at any level met with bin Laden or anyone in his circle." Bergen insists that U.S. funding went to the Afghan mujahideen, not the Arab volunteers who arrived to assist them.

Mustafa Setmariam Nasar, a former Afghan Arab fighter and suspected member of al-Qaeda states that, "[i]t is a big lie that the Afghan Arabs were formed with the backing of the CIA, whose minions were Bin Laden and Azzam ... the accusation that bin Laden was an employee of the CIA [is false]." Former Al-Qaeda leader Ayman al-Zawahiri wrote that "the United States did not give one penny to the [Arab] mujahideen. Is it possible that Osama bin Laden who, in his lectures in the year 1987, called for the boycott of U.S. goods ... is [a] U.S. agent in Afghanistan?" Abdullah Anas wrote, "I never learned, until my departure from Afghanistan, about the rumors concerning the CIA's involvement in the Afghan jihad through secret circles. I don't know, but what is known and clear is that the main supply depots for the jihad were in the bases of the Pakistani army in Peshawar."

Marc Sageman, a former CIA Operations Officer who was based in Islamabad from 1987 to 1989, and worked closely with Afghanistan's Mujahideen, states that no American money went to the Afghan Arabs, that "[n]o U.S. official ever came in contact with the foreign volunteers," and that they "never crossed U.S. radar screens."

According to Peter Beinart, quoting Vincent Cannistraro "who led the Reagan administration's Afghan Working Group from 1985 to 1987," the CIA "tried to avoid direct involvement in the [Soviet-Afghan] war," and that when Cannistraro coordinated Afghan policy, he never once heard bin Laden's name. Both "Bill Peikney—CIA station chief in Islamabad from 1984 to 1986—and Milt Bearden—CIA station chief from 1986 to 1989 [...] flatly denied that any CIA funds ever went to bin Laden," with Peikney stating that "I don't even recall UBL [bin Laden] coming across my screen when I was there." According to Bearden, the CIA did not recruit Arabs because there were hundreds of thousands of Afghans all too willing to fight.

Academic historian Paul Thomas Chamberlin wrote in 2018 that "[t]o date, no researcher has produced documentation of direct links between Washington and bin Laden or, for that matter, Zarqawi. The weight of evidence suggests that the CIA and the future leaders of Al-Qaeda and ISIS were not in communication with one another during the Soviet occupation in Afghanistan," but that "[n]evertheless, U.S. and Soviet operations in Afghanistan laid the groundwork for the rise of a global jihadist movement in the waning years of the Cold War."

== Agreements ==
In his 2004 book Ghost Wars, Steve Coll writes that "Bin Laden moved within Saudi intelligence's compartmented operations, outside of CIA eyesight. CIA archives contain no record of any direct contact between a CIA officer and bin Laden during the 1980s," commenting that "[i]f the CIA did have contact with bin Laden during the 1980s and subsequently covered it up, it has so far done an excellent job." Coll nonetheless documents that bin Laden at least informally cooperated with the ISI during the 1980s, and "tapping into ISI's guerrilla training camps on behalf of newly arrived Arab jihadists" to the notice of the CIA. Bin Laden also had intimate connections to CIA-backed mujahideen commander Jalaluddin Haqqani, and Milton Bearden, the CIA's Islamabad station chief from mid-1986 until mid-1989, took an admiring view of bin Laden at the time. Afghan assets recounted the fanaticism and intolerance of many of the so-called "Afghan Arabs" to the CIA, yet the CIA discounted these reports, instead contemplating direct support to the Arab volunteers under the guise of a Spanish Civil War-inspired "international brigade"—a concept that, according to Robert Gates then-Deputy Director of Central Intelligence, never got off paper. On the other hand, according to Rashid, then-CIA chief William J. Casey "committed CIA support to a long-standing ISI initiative to recruit radical Muslims from around the world to come to Pakistan and fight with the Afghan Mujaheddin." Norwegian academic historian Odd Arne Westad writes that the CIA funded "Islamic charitable organizations that provided assistance to the mujahedin," and that "[a]t least two of these organizations also recruited Muslim volunteers—mostly from North Africa—to fight in Afghanistan," with the CIA also helping run training camps in Egypt and "probably one in one of the Gulf states" for both native Afghan and Afghan Arab recruits.

Sir Martin Ewans stated that the Afghan Arabs "benefited indirectly from the CIA's funding, through the ISI and resistance organizations," and that "it has been reckoned that as many as 35,000 'Arab-Afghans' may have received military training in Pakistan at an estimated cost of $800 million in the years up to and including 1988."

Some of the CIA's greatest Afghan beneficiaries were Arabist commanders such as Haqqani and Gulbuddin Hekmatyar who were key allies of Bin Laden over many years. Haqqani—one of Bin Laden's closest associates in the 1980s—received direct cash payments from CIA agents, without the mediation of the ISI. This independent source of funding gave Haqqani disproportionate influence over the mujahideen, and helped Bin Laden develop his base.

Sheik Omar Abdel Rahman, an associate of Bin Laden's, was given visas to enter the US on four occasions by the CIA. Rahman was recruiting Arabs to fight in the Soviet-Afghan war, and Egyptian officials testified that the CIA actively assisted him. Rahman was a co-plotter of the 1993 World Trade Center bombing.

One allegation not denied by the US government is that the U.S. Army enlisted and trained a former Egyptian soldier named Ali Mohamed, and that it knew Ali occasionally took trips to Afghanistan, where he claimed to fight Russians. According to journalist Lawrence Wright, who interviewed U.S. officials about him, Ali told his Army superiors that he was fighting in Afghanistan, but did not tell them he was training other Afghan Arabs or writing a manual from what he had learned from the US Army Special Forces. Wright also reports that the CIA failed to inform other US agencies that it had learned Ali, who was a member of Egyptian Islamic Jihad, was an anti-American spy.

== See also ==
- Bank of Credit and Commerce International
- CIA activities in Afghanistan
- Operation Cyclone
- United States and state-sponsored terrorism
- Charlie Wilson's War: The Extraordinary Story of the Largest Covert Operation in History
- Saddam Hussein and al-Qaeda link allegations
