= TPON =

TPON might refer to:

- Telephony over Passive Optical Network, kind of telephone network
- The Power of Nightmares, 2004 documentary series
- The Philippine Order of Narnians, Filipino community of CS Lewis enthusiasts
- Two Parties One Nation, an Instagram-based mock government community
