= Springmann =

Springmann is a surname. Notable people with the surname include:

- Baldur Springmann (1912–2003), German organic farmer, neo-Nazi
- Henry Springmann (1859–1936), British rugby union player
- Michael Springmann, American civil servant
- Russell Springmann (born 1969), American college basketball coach
- Theresa Lazar Springmann (born 1956), American judge
