= Bitter Lake (film) =

2015 film by Adam Curtis

- Written by: Adam Curtis
- Directed by: Adam Curtis
- Country of origin: United Kingdom
- Original language: English

Production
- Producer: Lucy Kelsall
- Running time: 137 minutes

Original release
- Release: 25 January 2015

Related
- All Watched Over by Machines of Loving Grace (2011); HyperNormalisation (2016)

Bitter Lake is a 2015 BBC documentary by British filmmaker Adam Curtis. It argues that Western politicians have manufactured a simplified story about militant Islam, turning it into a good vs. evil argument informed by, and in a reaction to, Western society's increasing chaos and disorder, which they neither grasp nor understand. The film makes extended use of newsreels and archive footage, and intersperses brief narrative segments with longer segments that depict violence and war in Afghanistan.

== Plot ==
Bitter Lake attempts to explain several complex and interconnected narratives. One of the narratives is how past governments, including Russia and the West, with their continued, largely failing, interventions in Afghanistan, have kept repeating such failures, without properly understanding the country's cultural background or its past political history and societal structure.

The film also outlines the US's alliance with Saudi Arabia, especially the US's agreement to buy Saudi oil, for control of a key energy supplier during the cold-war era, with Saudi Arabia gaining wealth and security in return. Part of the agreement provided that Saudi Arabia was allowed to continue its violent and fundamentalist interpretation of Islam, Wahhabism, free from external influence. Saudi support for Wahhabism fed many of the militant Islamic forces from the 1970s to the present, including the Mujahideen, Taliban, Al-Qaeda, and the Islamic State.

Curtis describes the film as an attempt to add an "emotional" dimension to the context of the historical narrative in order to draw its audience in – hence its over two hours in length and availability exclusively through the BBC iPlayer – in order to give the viewer something beyond the disconnected news reports they're usually fed from most traditional broadcast journalism, along with putting historical facts in a truer broader context.

BBC iPlayer has given me the opportunity to do this - because it isn’t restrained by the rigid formats and schedules of network television. [...] I have got hold of the unedited rushes of almost everything the BBC has ever shot in Afghanistan. It is thousands of hours - some of it is very dull, but large parts of it are extraordinary. Shots that record amazing moments, but also others that are touching, funny and sometimes very odd. These complicated, fragmentary and emotional images evoke the chaos of real experience. And out of them I have tried to build a different and more emotional way of depicting what really happened in Afghanistan. A counterpoint to the thin, narrow and increasingly destructive stories told by those in power today.

The title is taken from the 1945 meeting of US president Franklin D. Roosevelt and King Abdulaziz of Saudi Arabia, on a ship on the Great Bitter Lake in the Suez Canal. Curtis portrays the meeting as leading to many of the events to follow. The film was released on 25 January 2015 exclusively on the BBC iPlayer.

== Reception ==
Sam Wollaston, writing in The Guardian, described the film as "distinctive, genuinely different. It’s also worrying, beautiful, funny (really), ambitious, serious, gripping and very possibly important." Wollaston commended Curtis for "at least taking a step back, to look at the modern world, then take it on," but admitted that the film was not completely successful in explaining the situation, leaving him with "confusion and uncertainty aplenty." While occasionally "infuriated" by Curtis's style – "all the wobbliness – at times I felt I was actually on a camel. And the sudden zooming in to people’s eyes, am I now riding a high-velocity high-explosive US bullet?" - Wollaston concluded that the film was "beautiful" and "television like no one else does".

Emma Graham-Harrison, also writing in The Guardian, noted that Curtis had done "a powerful job of conveying the sheer physical incongruity of NATO's heavy military presence in impoverished Afghanistan", and had captured "the strangeness of these heavily armoured soldiers wandering through superficially tranquil villages and pomegranate orchards, hunting an invisible enemy, and with it a deeper truth about how mismatched the soldiers were to their mission." While critical of some aspects of the film, particularly "of doing what he criticises politicians for: creating oversimplified stories to make sense of a complex world, and losing sight of the truth in the process", she felt that Curtis had managed to convey "the west’s terrible arrogance, the casual projection of foreign dreams and ideals on to a distant country and the readiness to walk away when it all starts going wrong".

Jasper Rees, for The Daily Telegraph, called the film "visually astonishing" and "an all-you-can-eat feast of impressionistic subtlety". Beyond the "extraordinary visuals", "the hypnotic jumble of footage", and the "insistent soundtrack pump[ing] out a manipulative pulse of music from East and West, telling you what to feel", Rees was less convinced by the film's narrative, describing it as "like being hectored by a dazzling know-all with x-ray vision who espies connections across the map of history." Rees was critical of the absence of fact-checking, and of the "only significant interview, with a Helmand veteran whose task is simply to repeat everything Curtis has already claimed. Mainly we are just invited to take his word for it". He concluded that "the egotism and grandiloquence are maddeningly at odds with the sustained brilliance of the spectacle", and "In the end, Adam Curtis sounds like just another prophet asking us to have faith in his vision. Which is an irony."

Jon Boone, the Pakistan correspondent for The Guardian, was less impressed by the film in his review for The Spectator, calling it "as simplistic as anything told by 'those in power', [and] made to seem frightfully clever by his acid-trip filmmaking style, perfectly spoofed by Ben Woodham as the 'televisual equivalent of a drunken late night Wikipedia binge with pretension for narrative coherence'". He was critical of the film's omission of Pakistan's role in the conflict - "the TV equivalent of staging Hamlet without the prince" - and Curtis's failure to tackle the real complexity of the situation, writing "it's pretty clear Curtis is as uninterested in such 'complexity' as he is in Afghans, a people he really doesn't seem to like very much. His most insidious story is that they are irredeemable savages who will always reject, steal or subvert the help of the most well-meaning of outsiders."

While also pointing to some of its limitations in his review for the online magazine Spiked, the academic Bill Durodie suggested the abiding image of the film to be "that of an English art teacher enthusiastically extolling the meaning of Marcel Duchamp’s conceptual artwork, Fountain, an inverted male urinal, to a group of recently liberated and incredulous Afghan women", before concluding his piece with the phrase "The horror! The horror!" taken from Heart of Darkness by Joseph Conrad. Overall, his view is that any perceived lack of meaning in Adam Curtis's montage was more than matched by the absence of purpose to the War in Afghanistan.

== Music ==
Music used at any stage or repeatedly, includes:

- Burial – "In McDonalds", "Dog Shelter" and "Come Down To Us"
- Cliff Martinez – OST for Drive (2011), including tracks "My Name On A Car", "Kick Your Teeth" and "I Drive"
- Kanye West – "Runaway"
- This Mortal Coil – "The Lacemaker"
- Nine Inch Nails – "A Warm Place" and "Every Day Is Exactly the Same"
- Ahmad Zahir – "Aye Nam Ghumat Taranae Man"
- Charles Ives - "The Unanswered Question"
- Messiaen – Turangalîla-Symphonie
- Christian Zanési – "Marseille 2"
- David Bowie – "The Bewlay Brothers" and "Warszawa"
- Pye Corner Audio – "Electronic Rhythm Number 3"
- Gavin Miller – "Ichor"
- The House In The Woods – "Sunlight On Rusting Hulk"
- "Kingdom of Shades" from ballet La Bayadère

== External clips ==
Clips from various films and television programmes are used to illustrate the documentary, especially from Carry On... Up the Khyber (a 1968 British comedy film), and Solaris, a 1972 film by Andrei Tarkovsky.

== See also ==
- The Power of Nightmares
- The Kajaki Dam, built by American aid in the 1950s.
