= The Philippine Order of Narnians =

- Formation: July 31, 2003
- Type: Literary Appreciation Group
- Headquarters: Makati
- Location: Philippines
- Members: Initially by joining the group's mailing list
- Key people: High King RE de Leon, King Francis Pasion, Queen Crissy Montes
- Website: http://www.filipinonarnians.org

The Philippine Order of Narnians (often called tPON) is the Philippines' only organized community of C. S. Lewis readers and enthusiasts. It aims to promote the discussion of all of Lewis works, exploring the themes in his writings, and celebrating Lewis' impact on today's world.

== Members ==
An eclectic group, tPON's almost 300 members range from grade school pupils to university professors, from all over the Philippines and from Filipino Communities in other countries.

According to tPON founder (and current High King) Professor RE de Leon, the group was created for Filipino or Philippines-based C.S. Lewis enthusiasts, with the term "Filipino" referring more to cultural, rather than national or political affiliation. Thus, tPON's officers explain, the group includes members who were raised in the Philippines but have since become citizens of other countries, and foreigners who live in the Philippines.

== Group Interests ==
While named after the Chronicles of Narnia, Lewis' most famous work, the group also appreciates Lewis' other works.

The organization is a member of the New Worlds Alliance, the alliance of different science fiction and fantasy fangroups in the Philippines. However, since not all of C.S. Lewis' works involve science fiction and fantasy, the group's interests are not limited to the science fiction and fantasy aspects of Lewis' work.

According to the group's website:

All of CS Lewis’ works are considered within the purview of tPON. We simply use the word “Narnians” because Narnia is by far Lewis’ most popular work. For example, Till We Have Faces has easily become a group favorite – not much of a surprise because Lewis himself considered it his best work. In fact, some of the members have never read a Narnia book! They start off from some other Lewis work such as The Screwtape Letters or The Four Loves or even Perelandra!

== Activities ==
=== Summons ===
In the tradition of several New Worlds Alliance (NWA) organizations, the regular tPON meetings have been named Summons. While this was initially considered the acceptable singular and plural form of the word, the current practice on the group's mailing list is to call these meetings Summonses in the plural form.

De Leon recalls that the name was suggested by Ian Roxas, then head of tPON's NWA sister group, The Philippine Tolkien Society (TPTS), during the very first Summons. (By the same tradition, TPTS' own meetings are called Moots)

Summonses are currently held about once every month, with the schedule decided by members' availability and announced on the group's website and mailing list.

The decision for the Summons venue is very fluid. Most of the time, tPON meets either at Mosaic Lounge, found on the 3rd floor of Greenbelt 1 building in Makati or at Seattle's Best Coffee at the nearby Greenbelt 3 building. Some occasions call for a South (Alabang) and North (Quezon City) Summons at times. Announcements are made via the mailing list.

=== Movie Promotion ===
During the recent release by Walden Media and Walt Disney Pictures of the cinematic version of The Chronicles of Narnia: The Lion, the Witch and the Wardrobe, tPON partnered with several organizations to promote the movie in several ways.

In November 2005, tPON partnered with the British Council and Fully Booked to hold symposium on The Chronicles of Narnia. It also invited the cast of the Trumpets' stageplay version of The Lion, the Witch and the Wardrobe and the co-writer of the libretto, Luna Griño-Inocian.

In January 2006, coinciding with the Philippine release of the movie, the organization partnered with Shangri-la Mall and Radio Station Magic 89.9 to hold a Cosplay contest and a special block screening of the movie.

=== CosPlays ===
Every now and then, tPON participates in Costuming Events sponsored by the NWA.

=== The Philippine Science Fiction and Fantasy Conventions ===
Previously an NWA member, tPON had been a regular participant of the Annual Philippine Science Fiction and Fantasy Convention.

== History ==
Starting from five group inactive mailing list members in July 2003, tPON grew slowly at first. But when some of the members attended the A Long Expected Party: the Second Philippine Science Fiction and Fantasy Convention in 2004, things began to heat up. New members came in, exciting discussions popped up, and the Filipino C.S. Lewis community grew. Since then, the annual New Worlds convention has become a sort of time-marker for the organization, signifying steps in the organization's history.

=== "After the Party" ===
It was in the aftermath after the convention that tPON's had its first few meetings.

The first meeting saw only four members come to a coffeeshop in Greenbelt3, Makati. The second, which was timed to coincide with a "moot" of The Philippine Tolkien Society, was better attended and saw the introduction of the name Summons to distinguish tPON meetings from those of other NWA groups.

It was also at this second meeting that names for the organization were first suggested. Names like "The CS Lewis Society of the Philippines" and "Filipino Narnians" were suggested along with humorous suggestions such as "Lamp Post Philippines", "The Philippine Wardrobe Society" and "The Lion's Club". "The Philippine Order of Narnians" eventually won out, though it took almost a year before the name was officially accepted.

The Group also began meeting at Mosaic Lounge, another venue in Makati, which now serves as the meeting place of choice for tPON.

=== New Worlds: Episode III ===
In 2005, the group was formally invited to become a participant of New Worlds Episode III: Third Philippine Science Fiction and Fantasy Convention, and had provisionally become a member of the New Worlds Alliance (NWA), the umbrella organization of Science Fiction/Fantasy Organizations who were managed the annual convention.

The last stretch of 2005 proved very hectic for tPON. From November 2005 to January 2006, the organization was busy promoting the movie adaptation of The Lion the Witch and the Wardrobe.

==== New Worlds Alliance Council Membership ====
In July 2006, tPON took part in 'New Worlds 4: A Broken Time Machine', which marked its second full participation in a major NWA activity and qualified it to be a full member of the organization. The organization came within a hair's breadth of bagging that year's Best Booth award for its eye-catching "Aslan's Tent" motif.

Because it had become a full member of the NWA, it was selected along with another NWA member, Arkham Philippines, to become part of the NWA Council as of January 13, 2007.

The NWA Council was originally composed of the seven charter groups who were present at the formation of the New Worlds Alliance in 2003. Over time, two groups become inactive and thus forfeited their place in the Council.

In October 2007, tPON did not participate in the New Worlds 5 convention due to the concern for safety brought upon by the mall blasts at the Glorietta which happened a week before the said convention.

In early 2008, tPON left the New Worlds Alliance to concentrate more on scholarly endeavors which is one of the main purposes of the group. tPON acknowledges NWA's contribution to the Filipino-Narnian community.

== Definitions ==
tPON - An acronym for the group, properly characterized by a small "t".

Summons - tPON's regular meetings

High King - The head of the organization, currently group founder and novelist RE de Leon.

King or Queen - Officers of tPON, somewhat analogous to Vice Presidents, but with Executive power, which is not exclusive to the high king. The current King for External Affairs is Martin Badoy, the current Queen for Financial Affairs is Crissy Montes and the current Queen for Events Management is Ilia Uy.

The Order of the Lion - An informal group of regular members, consulted by the Kings and Queens regarding most of the organization's decisions.

Filipino Narnian - An alternative way of referring to the group's members, this is a reference to the members' "dual citizenship." The member is both a Filipino (by heart if not by Nationality) and a "Narnian", a citizen of Narnia.
