= Milton Bearden =

American author

- Born: Oklahoma
- Citizenship: American
- Education: University of Texas at Austin (BA); Yale Institute of Far Eastern Languages
- Occupations: Author; Film consultant
- Spouse: Marie-Catherine Bearden

Milton Bearden is an American author, film consultant, and former CIA officer. Bearden served as the president and CEO of the Asia-Africa Projects Group, a Washington, D.C.–based firm that provides resource development and advisory services, from 2010 to 2015. He has been engaged in authorship and film consultancy since 1998.

As of 2016, Bearden resides in Austin, Texas, with his wife, Marie-Catherine, a retired university professor, at Georgetown University and the University of Texas at Austin, and currently a professional consultant on inter-cultural protocols and etiquette.

== Early life and education ==
Bearden was born in Oklahoma and spent his early years in the state of Washington, where his father worked on the Manhattan Project, and later moved with his family to Houston, Texas. After serving in the United States Air Force, he joined the CIA in 1964. Bearden studied Chinese at the Yale Institute of Far Eastern Languages and earned a Bachelor of Arts degree in linguistics from the University of Texas at Austin.

== Career ==
=== CIA ===
During his 30-year career with the CIA, Bearden was a station chief in Pakistan, Nigeria, Sudan and Germany. He served as the CIA's chief of station in Pakistan from 1986 to 1989, and as part of Operation Cyclone managed the Agency's provision of arms, intelligence and training to the ISI which in turn provided the Afghan mujahedeen fighting occupying Soviet forces. He was also responsible for collecting intelligence on Pakistan's then-covert nuclear weapons program.

Bearden appeared several times in the BBC Documentary by Adam Curtis called The Power of Nightmares where he talked of his involvement with the Mujahadeen, the Afghan Arabs and how he was assigned to the role by William Casey, the then current Director of Central Intelligence. According to Bearden, Casey told him that Afghanistan seemed to be possibly one of the keys to winning. Casey said "'I want you to go to Afghanistan, I want you to go next month and I will give you what ever you need to win... He gave me the Stinger missiles and a billion dollars!"

Bearden was one of the senior CIA officials criticized in the 1994 "snitch fax". The fax was allegedly written by ex-CIA officer David Sullivan, and addressed to members of Congress investigating CIA issues, including the Aldrich Ames spy case.

He was later appointed the Chief of the Soviet/East European Division during the collapse of the Soviet Union. He received the Distinguished Intelligence Medal, the Intelligence Medal of Merit and the Donovan Award for his CIA service. He received the Federal Cross of Merit from the President of the German Federal Republic for his service in Germany at the end of the Cold War.

=== Writer and commentator ===
Since retiring, Bearden has written books based on his experiences, commented on current events, and appeared on television, including Secret Warriors (Discovery Channel), Covert Action (BBC), The Power of Nightmares (BBC2), and Heroes Under Fire (The History Channel). Although generally supportive of the CIA and its mission, he has also been outspoken in his criticism of US actions in the war on terrorism. He was co-author of one book with James Risen. Bearden is a frequent contributor to the op-ed pages of the New York Times, the Los Angeles Times and The Wall Street Journal, and has contributed to Foreign Affairs and to the book about the September 11 attacks, How Did This Happen?, published by PublicAffairs. He also serves as a consultant for CBS News.

In August 1999, he argued that the threat posed by Osama bin Laden had been blown out of proportion. He called for the U.S. government to renounce "any plans for a unilateral military action against Osama bin Laden or for another cruise missile attack on Afghanistan." Bearden also called for a "serious dialogue" with the Taliban and said that they "have no more obligation to extradite Osama bin Laden to the United States than, say, the French do in the case of Ira Einhorn or the Israelis in the case of Samuel Scheinbein—both of whom are fugitives from American justice in capital murder cases".

Following the September 11 attacks, he coined the term "graveyard of empires" to refer to Afghanistan, invoking Afghan victories against outside invaders which had significant political consequences for the invading nations. Bearden predicted that relying on the Northern Alliance against majority ethnic groups would create "a brutal, general civil war that would continue until the United States simply gave up".

Bearden has provided commentary for several documentaries films and television series, including Nightline, 60 Minutes, Biography, Uncovered: The War on Iraq, The Power of Nightmares: The Rise of the Politics of Fear, National Geographic: Inside 9/11, Our Own Private Bin Laden, The Eighties, Afghanistan 1979, Spy Wars, and Afghanistan: The Wounded Land.

=== Film consultant ===
He worked with Robert De Niro on Ronin and Meet the Parents, and worked with De Niro and screenwriter Eric Roth (Forrest Gump, The Insider) on The Good Shepherd, released in December 2006. Universal Studios and De Niro's Tribeca Productions have optioned The Main Enemy as a planned sequel to The Good Shepherd. He also worked with director Mike Nichols on the film Charlie Wilson's War, released in December 2007.

== See also ==
- Operation Cyclone
- Michael Pillsbury

== Books ==
- The Black Tulip: A Novel of War in Afghanistan (1998) ISBN 0-375-76083-0
- The Main Enemy, The Inside story of the CIA's Final showdown with the KGB, with James Risen (2003) ISBN 0-679-46309-7
- How Did This Happen, Terrorism and The New War (2001) (contributor) ISBN 1-58648-130-4
