= Abdullah Yusuf Azzam =

Palestinian Islamic scholar and jihadist (1941–1989)

- عبد الله يوسف عزام

Personal life
- Born: 14 November 1941 Silat al-Harithiya, Mandatory Palestine
- Died: 24 November 1989 (aged 48) Peshawar, Pakistan
- Cause of death: Assassination via car bomb
- Citizenship: Jordanian (1948–1989)
- Education: Damascus University (BA); Al-Azhar University (PhD)
- Known for: Mentoring Osama bin Laden in Saudi Arabia and co-founding Maktab al-Khidamat in Pakistan
- Occupation: ʿAlim and theologian
- Relations: Abdullah Anas (son-in-law)

Religious life
- Religion: Islam
- Denomination: Sunni
- Jurisprudence: Shafi’i
- Creed: Athari
- Movement: Muslim Brotherhood

Abdullah Yusuf Azzam (Note: Arabic: عبد الله يوسف عزام, romanized: ʿAbd Allāh Yūsuf ʿAzzām) (14 November 1941 – 24 November 1989) was a Palestinian-born Sunni Islamist scholar and Jihadist leader. He and his family fled from what had been the Jordanian-annexed West Bank after the 1967 Six-Day War and pursued higher education in Jordan and Egypt before relocating to Saudi Arabia. In 1979, Azzam issued a fatwa advocating for defensive jihad in light of the outbreak of the Soviet–Afghan War, and subsequently moved to Pakistan to support the Afghan mujahideen.

As a teacher and mentor to Saudi militant Osama bin Laden, he was one of the key figures who persuaded bin Laden to go to Afghanistan and personally oversee the mujahideen efforts in that country. In 1984, Azzam and bin Laden co-founded Maktab al-Khidamat, an Islamic advocacy organization that sought to raise funds for the mujahideen while also recruiting non-Afghan fighters for their cause. Following the Soviet withdrawal from Afghanistan in 1989, he continued to promote jihadist militancy on behalf of other Muslims in other countries, which led him to become known as the "father of global jihad" in many jihadist circles. Months later, Azzam was killed by a car bomb detonated by unknown assailants in Peshawar, Pakistan.

His son Huthaifa Azzam, who assumes his father's legacy, says that al-Qaeda's methods of targeting civilians in the West or elsewhere would have been rebuked by Azzam, as would have been the use of kidnappings and beheadings.

== Early life and citizenship ==
Azzam was born on 14 November 1941 in Silat al-Harithiya, in what was then the British Mandate for Palestine, to a family of Palestinian Arabs. As part of the Jordanian annexation of the West Bank following the 1948 Arab–Israeli War, Azzam was granted, alongside most Palestinians, Jordanian nationality. Azzam has been described by most of his biographers as being exceptionally intelligent as a child. He liked to read, excelled in class, and studied topics above his grade level.

== Education ==
=== Muslim Brotherhood ===
In the mid-1950s, Azzam joined the Muslim Brotherhood after being influenced by Shafiq Asad 'Abd al-Hadi, an elderly local teacher who was a member of the Muslim Brotherhood. Recognizing Azzam's sharp mind, Shafiq Asad gave Azzam a religious education and introduced him to many of the Muslim Brotherhood's leaders in Palestine. Azzam became more interested in Islamic studies and started a study group in his village. Shafiq Asad then introduced Azzam to Muhammad 'Abd ar-Rahman Khalifa, the Muraqib 'Am (General Supervisor) of the Muslim Brotherhood in Jordan. Khalifa met with Azzam during several visits that he made to Silat al-Harithiya. During this part of his life, Azzam began reading the works of Hasan al-Banna and other Muslim Brotherhood writings which greatly influenced his views. The teachings of prominent Muslim Brotherhood members such as Sayyid Qutb and its founder Hassan al-Banna greatly influenced the views of Azzam.

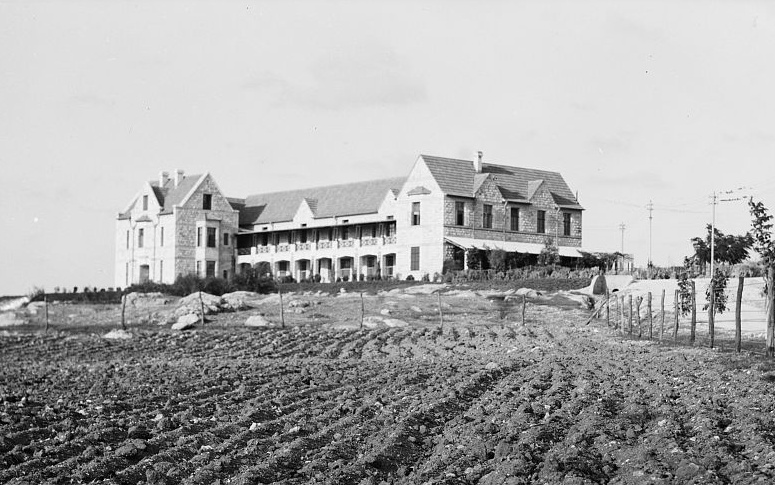
Khaduri College in the 1930s

In the late 1950s, after he had completed his elementary and secondary education, Azzam left Silat al-Harithiya and enrolled in the agricultural Khaduri College in Tulkarm, about 30 kilometres southwest of his village. Though he was a year younger than his classmates, he received good grades. After graduation from the college, students were sent out to teach at local schools. Azzam was sent to the village of Adir, near the town of Kerak in central Jordan. According to one of his biographers, Azzam had wanted a position closer to home, but was sent to a distant school after an argument with his college's dean. After spending a year in Adir, Azzam returned to the West Bank, where he taught at a school in the village of Burqin, about four kilometers west of Jenin. His colleagues in Burqin remembered him as being noticeably more religious than them. During breaks, while others ate, Azzam would sit and read the Quran.

=== Islamic studies in Syria ===
In 1963, Azzam enrolled in the Faculty of Sharia at the University of Damascus in Syria. While in Damascus, he met Islamic scholars and leaders including Shaykh Muhammad Adib Salih, Shaykh Sa`id Hawwa, Shaykh Mohamed Said Ramadan Al-Bouti, Mullah Ramadan al-Buti, and Shaykh Marwan Hadid. Azzam's mentor, Shafiq Asad `Abd al-Hadi died in 1964. This strengthened Azzam's determination in working for the cause of Islam. During the holidays, Azzam would return to his village, where he would teach and preach in the mosque. Azzam graduated with highest honors in 1966, receiving a Bachelor of Arts in Sharia. Thereafter he returned to the West Bank, where he taught and preached in the region around his village.

=== 1967 Arab–Israeli War and the Palestinian cause ===
After the 1967 Six-Day War ended with the Israeli military occupation of the West Bank, Azzam and his family left the West Bank and followed the Palestinian exodus to Jordan.

In Jordan, Azzam participated in paramilitary operations against the Israeli occupation, but became disillusioned with the secular and provincial nature of the Palestinian resistance coalition held together under the umbrella of the Palestine Liberation Organization (PLO) and led by Yasser Arafat.

Instead of pursuing the PLO's Marxist-oriented national liberation struggle supported by the Soviet Union, Azzam envisioned a pan-Islamic trans-national movement that would transcend the political map of the Middle East drawn by European colonial powers.

=== Islamic studies in Egypt ===
In Egypt, Azzam continued his studies at the prestigious Al-Azhar University, getting a PhD in Principles of Islamic Jurisprudence in 1973, while being acquainted during his stay with the ideas of Sayyid Qutb. He completed his 600-page doctoral thesis in around 16 months.

Some researchers believe he had a role as an ideologist in founding the Islamist Hamas movement in Palestine.

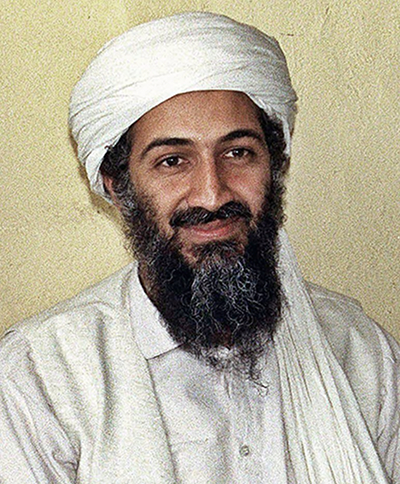
Osama bin Laden

=== Professor in Saudi Arabia ===
Azzam took a position as lecturer at King Abdul Aziz University in Jeddah, Saudi Arabia, where he remained until 1979. Osama bin Laden was enrolled as a student in the university between 1976 and 1981 and probably first met Azzam during that time.

== Involvement in the Soviet–Afghan War ==
When the Soviet Union intervened in Afghanistan on request of the Khalqist government in 1979, Azzam issued a fatwa, Defence of the Muslim Lands, the First Obligation after Faith, declaring that both the Afghan and Palestinian struggles were jihads and that all able-bodied Muslims had a duty to fight against foreign occupations of Islamic countries. The edict was supported by Saudi Arabia's Grand Mufti, Abd al-Aziz Bin Baz.

=== Activities in Pakistan and Afghanistan ===
Azzam began to teach at International Islamic University, Islamabad, Pakistan in 1981. Soon thereafter, he moved to Peshawar, closer to the Afghan border, where he established Maktab al-Khadamat (Services Office) to organize guest houses in Peshawar and paramilitary training camps in Afghanistan to prepare international recruits for the Afghan war front. An estimated 16,000 to 35,000 Muslim volunteers from around the world came to fight in Afghanistan. Thousands more Muslims attended "frontier schools teeming with former and future fighters."

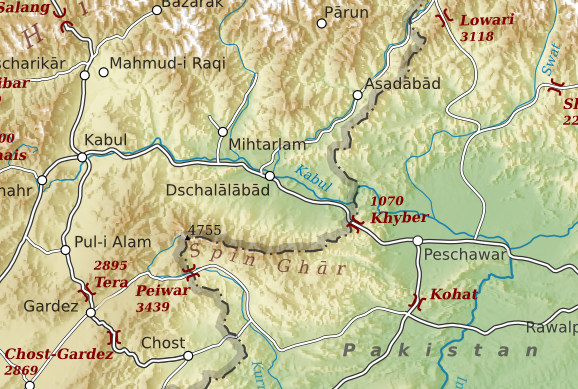
2011 map of the Khyber Pass (center right) and surrounding areas, including Peshawar (right)

From there, Azzam was able to organize resistance directly on the Afghan frontier. Peshawar is only 15 km east of the Khyber Pass, through the Safed Koh mountains, connected to the southeastern edge of the Hindu Kush range. This route became the major avenue for inserting foreign fighters and material support into eastern Afghanistan for the resistance against the Soviets and their DRA allies.

After bin Laden graduated from the university in Jeddah in 1981, he also lived for a time in Peshawar; Azzam convinced bin Laden to help personally finance the training of recruits. Some have suggested that Mohammed Atef was responsible for convincing Azzam to abandon his academic pursuits to devote himself solely to preaching jihad.

Through al-Khadamat, bin Laden's fortune paid for air tickets and accommodation, dealt with paperwork with Pakistani authorities and provided other such services for the jihad fighters. To keep al-Khadamat running, bin Laden set up a network of couriers travelling between Afghanistan and Peshawar, which continued to remain active after 2001, according to Rahimullah Yusufzai, executive editor of The News International.

After orientation and training, Muslim recruits volunteered for service with various Afghan militias tied to Azzam. In 1984, Osama bin Laden founded Bait ul-Ansar (House of Helpers) in Peshawar to expand Azzam's ability to support "Afghan Arab" jihad volunteers and, later, to create his own independent militia.

In 1988, Azzam convinced Ahmed Khadr to raise funds for an alleged new charity named al-Tahaddi, based in Peshawar. He granted Khadr a letter of commendation to take back to Canadian mosques, calling for donations. However, the pair had a sensationalist showdown when Khadr insisted that he had a right to know how the money would be spent, and Azzam's supporters labelled Khadr a Western spy. A Sharia court was convened in bin Laden's compound, and Azzam was found guilty of spreading allegations against Khadr, though no sentence was imposed.

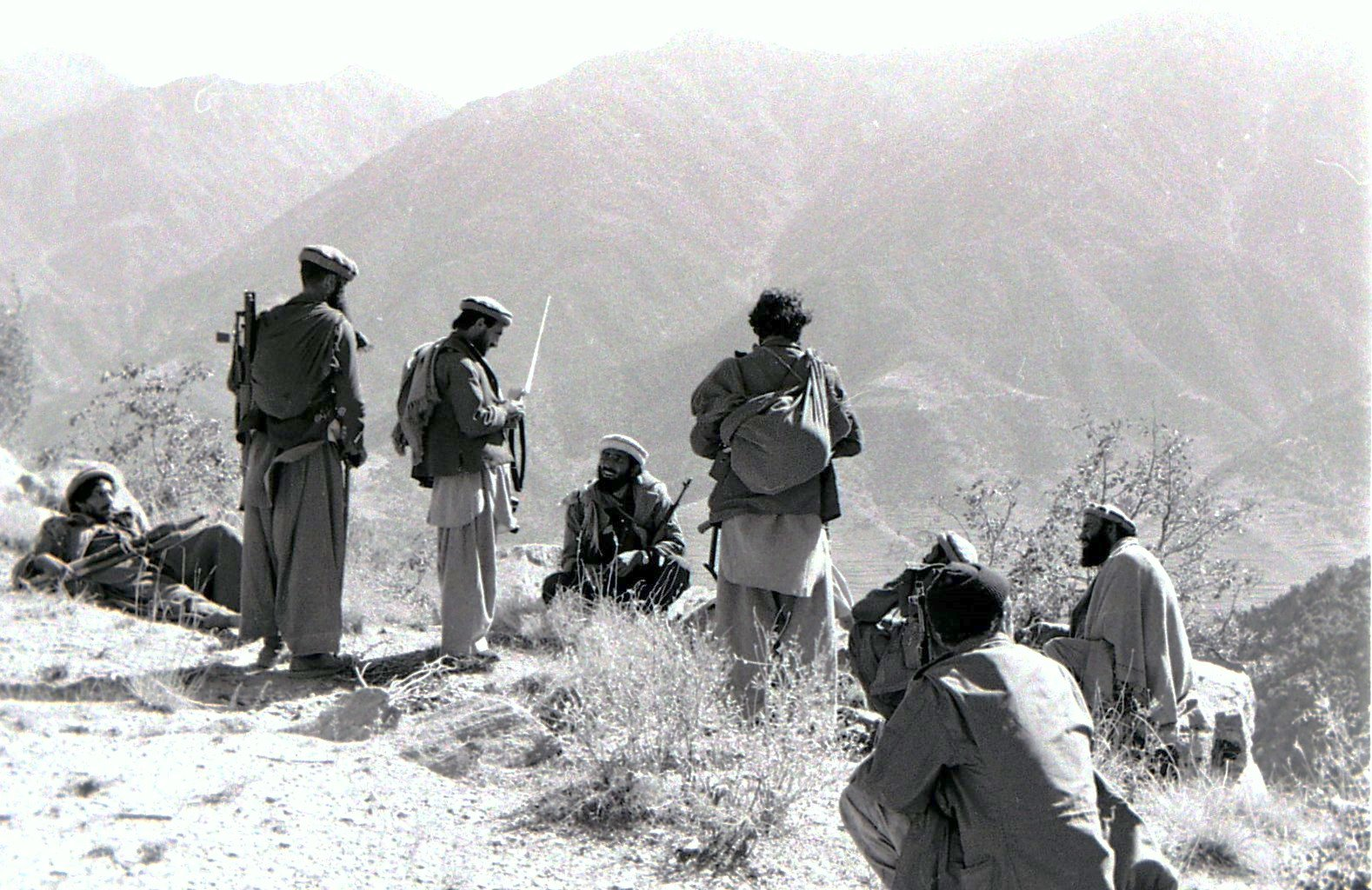
Mujahideen fighters in Afghanistan's Kunar Province in 1987

Employing tactics of asymmetric warfare, the Afghan resistance movement was able to fend off the militarily superior Soviet Armed Forces throughout most of the war, although the lightly armed Afghan mujahideen suffered enormous casualties. The Saudi Arabian government and the CIA gradually increased financial and military assistance to the Afghan mujahideen forces throughout the 1980s in an effort to stem Soviet expansionism and to destabilize the Soviet Union.

Azzam frequently joined Afghan militias and international Muslim units as they battled the Soviet Union's forces in Afghanistan. He became an inspirational figure among the Afghan resistance and freedom-fighting Muslims worldwide for his passionate attachment to jihad against foreign occupation.

In the 1980s, Azzam traveled throughout the Middle East, Europe and North America, including 50 cities in the United States, to raise money and preach about jihad. He inspired young Muslims with stories of miraculous deeds, mujahideen who defeated vast columns of Soviet troops virtually single-handed, who had been run over by tanks but survived, who were shot but unscathed by bullets. He also claimed angels were witnessed riding into battle on horseback, and falling bombs were intercepted by birds, which raced ahead of the jets to form a protective canopy over the warriors. Steven Emerson's 1994 television documentary Terrorists Among Us: Jihad in America includes an excerpt from a video of Abdullah Azzam in which he exhorts his audience to wage jihad in America (which Azzam explains "means fighting only, fighting with the sword"), and his cousin, Fayiz Azzam, says "Blood must flow. There must be widows; there must be orphans." Azzam recruited the Al Kifah Refugee Center as the Marktab al-Khidamat's official branch in the United States, the only country to have one aside from Pakistan. Azzam also radicalized El Sayyid Nosair, the man responsible for the assassination of Meir Kahane in 1990. In 1989, the FBI office in Dallas started investigating Azzam for his role in recruiting foreign mujahideen fighters for the Soviet–Afghan War.

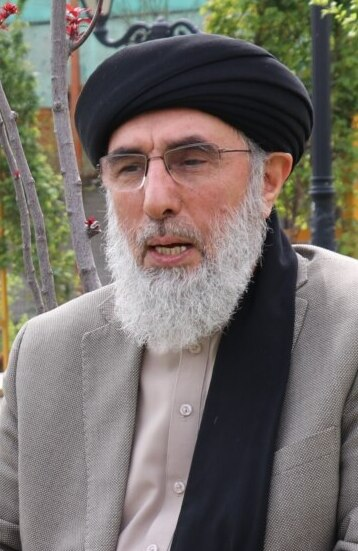
Gulbuddin Hekmatyar

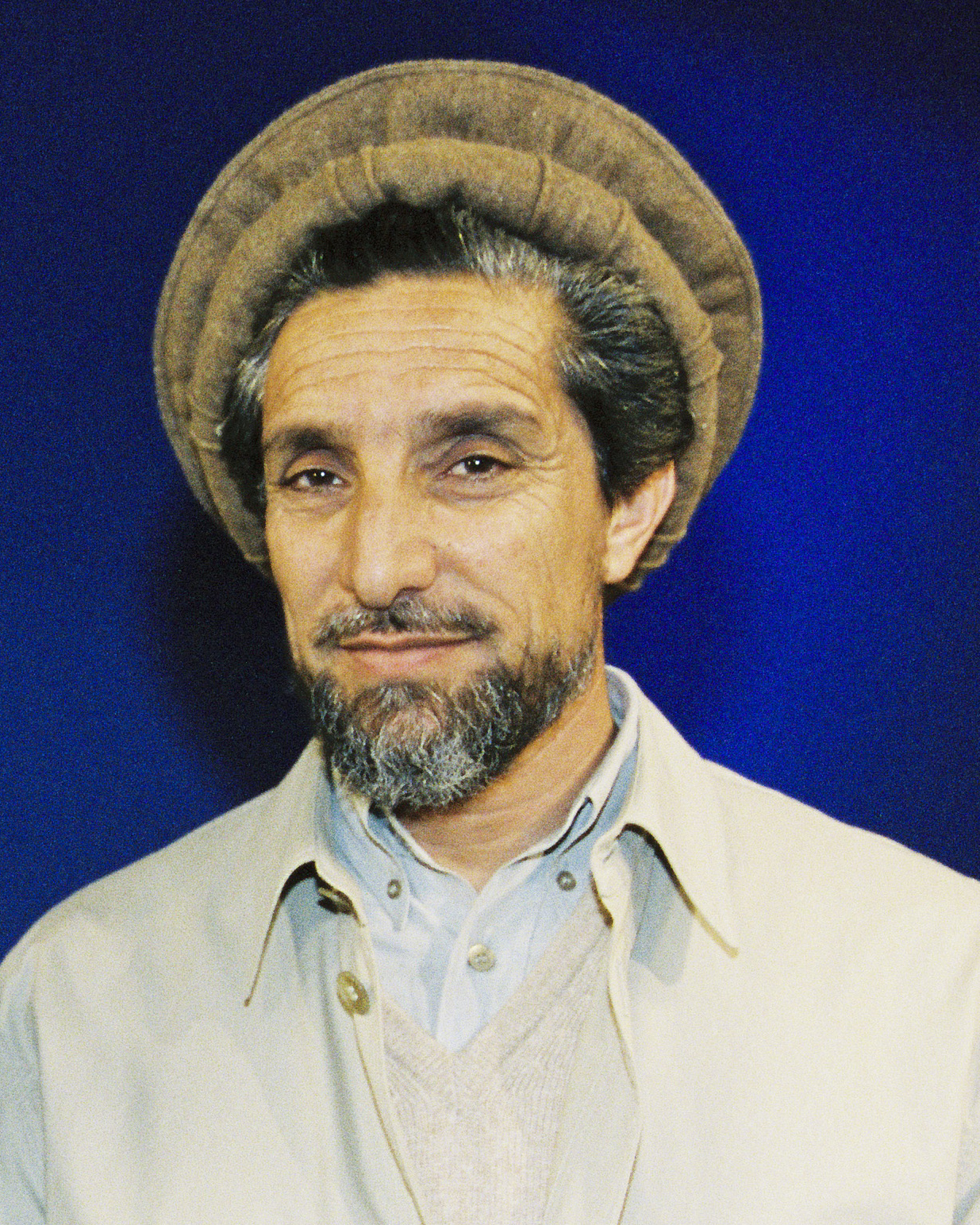
Ahmad Shah Massoud

After the Soviet withdrawal from Afghanistan, Azzam became disillusioned with the breakout of the Afghan Civil War in which former Muslim members of the mujahideen fought each other. Azzam initially supported Gulbuddin Hekmatyar and Hezb-e Islami Gulbuddin in the war, but after meeting Ahmad Shah Massoud in the Panjshir Valley switched his preference to Jamiat-e-Islami. He compared Massoud to Napoleon and told audiences in Saudi Arabia and Kuwait, "I have seen the future of jihad. It is Massoud!" This put him at odds with bin Laden, who continued supporting Hezb-e-Islami Gulbuddin.

=== Global jihad ===
Azzam's trademark slogan was "Jihad and the rifle alone: no negotiations, no conferences and no dialogues." In Join the Caravan, Azzam implored Muslims to rally in defense of Muslim victims of aggression, to restore Muslim lands from foreign domination, and to uphold the Muslim faith. He emphasized the violence of religion, preaching that, "those who believe that Islam can flourish [and] be victorious without Jihad, fighting, and blood are deluded and have no understanding of the nature of this religion."

Azzam has been criticized for justifying the killing of civilians deemed mushrikeen (polytheists) in jihad, telling followers that:

Many Muslims know about the hadith in which the Prophet ordered his companions not to kill any women or children, etc., but very few know that there are exceptions to this case. In summary, Muslims do not have to stop an attack on mushrikeen, if non-fighting women and children are present.

Given the broad definition of mushrikeen used by some Muslims, at least one author (Dore Gold) has wondered if this could have led to followers being less concerned about killing women and children.

However, Azzam's son, Huthaifa Azzam, has told journalist Henry Schuster that his father did not generally approve of attacks on civilians.

Azzam built a scholarly, ideological and practical paramilitary infrastructure for the globalization of Islamist movements that had previously focused on separate national, revolutionary and liberation struggles. Azzam's philosophical rationalization of global jihad and practical approach to recruitment and training of Muslim militants from around the world blossomed during the Afghan war against Soviet occupation and proved crucial to the subsequent development of the al-Qaeda militant movement.

Like Sayyid Qutb, Azzam urged the creation of a "pioneering vanguard", as the core of a new Islamic society. "This vanguard constitutes the solid base [qaeda in Arabic] for the hoped-for society. ... We shall continue the jihad no matter how long the way, until the last breath and the last beat of the pulse – or until we see the Islamic state established." From its victory in Afghanistan jihad would liberate Muslim land (or land where Muslims form a minority in the case of the Philippines or formerly Muslim land in the case of Spain) ruled by unbelievers: the southern Soviet Republics of Central Asia, Philippines, Bosnia, Kashmir, Somalia, Eritrea, and Spain.

==== Ties with Hamas ====
He believed the natural place to continue the jihad was his homeland, Palestine. Azzam planned to train brigades of Hamas fighters in Afghanistan, who would then return to Palestine and carry on the battle against Israel." He viewed Hamas as "the spearhead in the religious confrontation between Muslims and Jews in Palestine". During the First Intifada, he supported Hamas politically, financially and logistically from his base in the city of Peshawar, Pakistan.

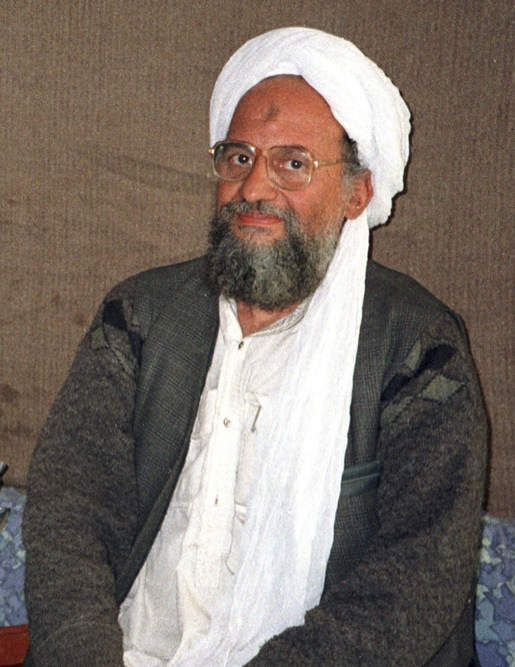
Ayman al-Zawahiri

This put him at odds with another influential faction of the Afghan Arabs, the Egyptian Islamic Jihad (EIJ) and its leader, Ayman al-Zawahiri. The next group of "unbelievers" the EIJ wanted to make jihad against were the self-professed Muslims of the Egyptian government and other secular Muslim governments, not Israeli Jews or European Christians. For the Egyptian Islamic Jihad, takfir (excommunication) against the allegedly impious Egyptian government was central, but Azzam opposed takfir of Muslims, including takfir of Muslim governments, which he believed spread fitna and disunity within the Muslim community. Towards the end of his life he said "I’m very upset about Osama. This heaven-sent man, like an angel. I am worried about his future if he stays with these people."

== Assassination ==
In 1989, a first attempt on his life failed, when a lethal amount of TNT explosive placed beneath the pulpit from which he delivered the sermon every Friday failed to detonate. The Arab mosque was in the University Town neighbourhood in western Peshawar, in Gulshan Iqbal Road. Abdullah Azzam used the mosque as the jihad centre, according to a Reuters inquiry in the neighbourhood. Had the bomb exploded, it would have reportedly destroyed the mosque and killed everybody inside it. After the first attempt, Prince Turki bin Faisal of Saudi Arabia's chief of staff Ahmed Badeeb advised Azzam to leave Afghanistan.

On 24 November 1989, Muhammad Azzam was driving his father and brother to Friday prayers in the Saba-e-Leil Mosque in Peshawar, when unknown assassins detonated a bomb as the vehicle approached. Lying in a narrow street across from a petrol station, the explosive had a 50-metre detonation cord which led to the sewerage system where the assailant presumably waited. According to Time, political analyst Waheed Muzhda had noticed what he assumed was a crew doing routine road maintenance working on the culvert where the bomb was placed, the day before the assassination. Azzam and his sons were buried near the same site as his mother the year before, the Pabi Graveyard of the Shuhadaa' (martyrs), in Peshawar.

=== Suspects ===
Suspects in the assassination include competing Islamist militia leaders, such as Hekmatyar, as well as the CIA, the Mossad, and KHAD. Following the assassination, the President of Afghanistan Mohammad Najibullah criticized Arab foreign fighters telling them to go do "jihad closer to home". Najibullah was a very active opponent of Wahhabism which he saw as contradictory to traditional Afghan values. Former FBI agent Ali Soufan mentioned in his book, The Black Banners, that Ayman al-Zawahiri is suspected of being behind the assassination. Azzam's son-in-law, Abdullah Anas, accused the Egyptian Islamic Jihad of killing his father-in-law for issuing a fatwa that "once the Russian were ejected from Afghanistan, it would not be permissible for us to take sides."

Several associates of Azzam suspect the killing was part of a purge of those who favored moving the jihad to Palestine. In March 1991, Mustapha Shalabi, who ran the Services Bureau in New York and was also "said to prefer a 'Palestine next' strategy, turned up dead in his apartment." He was replaced by Wadih el-Hage, who later became bin Laden's personal secretary.

Bin Laden has also been accused of being a suspect in the murder, but seems to have remained on good terms with Azzam during this time. However, it was reported that Bin Laden and Azzam also had a major dispute on where al-Qaeda should focus their operations. Bin Laden favored using the organization to train fighters in various parts of the world while Azzam favored keeping the training camps in Afghanistan. Azzam also objected to Bin Laden's favoring of Hekmatyar.

Yet another actor accused of the assassination is the Iranian Ministry of Intelligence, an active opponent of Wahhabism. In 2009, Jordanian double agent Humam Khalil Abu-Mulal al-Balawi claimed knowledge of Jordanian General Intelligence Directorate cooperation with the CIA to set up the assassination.

== Legacy ==
After his death, Azzam's militant ideology and related paramilitary manuals were promoted through print and Internet media by Azzam Publications, a publishing house that operated from a London post office box and a website. Both were shut down shortly after the September 11 attacks and are no longer active, though mirror sites persisted for some time afterwards. Babar Ahmad, the administrator of azzam.com, was extradited from the United Kingdom to the United States where he pleaded guilty to "conspiracy and providing material support to terrorism."

Azzam popularized the idea of armed Islamic struggle (which went on to be developed further by groups such as the Armed Islamic Group of Algeria). Prior to his work, declarations of jihad in the twentieth century (such as against Israel) were essentially rhetorical and served more as a religious blessing of wars already declared and organized by secular bodies. But with his tireless travel and exhortation of activists, thousands of whom traveled to be trained and to fight in Afghanistan, what Azzam "called for actually came about".

Azzam also broadened the idea of jihad. Azzam preached that jihad was:

- the transcendent in importance – 'one hour in the path of jihad is worth more than 70 years of praying at home';
- and had global significance – 'if a piece of Muslim land the size of a hand-span is infringed upon, then jihad becomes fard `ayn [a personal obligation] on every Muslim male and female, where the child shall march forward without the permission of its parents and the wife without the permission of the husband.'

Azzam had considerable impact. Fatwas going back to the Crusades had urged Muslims to defend one another against an invasion, but his contention that "such defense was a global obligation," that "Muslims everywhere were personally bound to take up arms" against invasions such as the Soviet's, was "all but unprecedented".

Azzam is thought to have had influence on jihadists such as al-Qaeda with the third stage of his "four-stage process of jihad". This third stage was "ribat," defined as "placing oneself at the frontlines where Islam was under siege". This idea is thought to reinforce militants' "perception of a civilizational war between Islam and the West". While al-Qaeda was founded by bin Laden, it is believed that Azzam started the idea of creating a "base" organization for jihad to spread around the world. His son Huthaifa Azzam, who assumes his father's legacy, on the other hand, says that al-Qaeda's methods of targeting civilians in the West or elsewhere would have been rebuked by Azzam, as would have been the use of kidnappings and beheadings.

The internationally recognized terrorist group Abdullah Azzam Brigades (a Lebanese branch of al-Qaeda) is named after Azzam.

== Published works ==
Having "published over 100 books, articles and recorded conferences", some of his books include:

- Defence of the Muslim Lands: The First Obligation after Faith, 1979 (many typographical errors); 2002 (second English ed., revised with improved citations and spelling.) Is a study on the legal rulings of Jihad. It discusses the types of Jihad, the conditions under which Jihad becomes an obligation upon all Muslims, parents’ permission, fighting in the absence of the Islamic State and peace treaties with the enemy.
- The Titans of the North, was a book written by Abdullah Azzam but which he was unable to get printed. In it, he praised noted commander Ahmad Shah Massoud (who was later assassinated by al-Qaeda) but because almost all of Peshawar was semi-owned by warlord Gulbuddin Hekmatyar, no one would print it there.

== See also ==
- Egyptian Islamic Jihad
- Jamaat-e-Islami Pakistan
- Mujahideen
- Reagan Doctrine
- Azzam the American
- Hasan al-Banna
- Javed Ahmed Ghamidi
- Khurshid Ahmad
- Mohammad Amin al-Husayni
- Sayyid Abul Ala Maududi
- Sayyid Qutb
- Yusuf al-Qaradawi
- Brigades of Abdullah Azzam
- Abdullah Azzam Shaheed Brigade
- Ayman al-Zawahiri
