= Abdullah Anas =

Algerian scholar

- Born: 1958 (age 67–68)
- Citizenship: Algeria
- Occupations: Scholar; Mujahid; Writer

Abdullah Anas was the nom de guerre of Boudjema Bounoua who was an Algerian scholar, who helped Afghanistan mujahideen fight the Soviet and Afghan government forces in the northern provinces from 1983 to 1992.

Anas met Ahmed Khadr in 1984 and described him as "not a man of fighting, not a man of jihad, just a man of charity work aid".

== Biography ==
In 1988, Anas spoke to Abdullah Azzam about the need to ensure Muslim help reached northern Afghanistan, and not just that of Western NGOs. He later married the daughter of Azzam, of whom bin Laden is suspected of assassinating.

On 14 January 2001, he was interviewed by The New York Times reporter Stephen Engleberg, who asked him to describe Osama bin Laden, to which he replied that "He's not very sophisticated politically and organizationally. But he's an activist with a great imagination. He ate very little. He slept very little. Very generous, he'd give you his clothes."

Following the United States invasion of Afghanistan in 2001, Anas gave reports critical of bin Laden, reflecting the pair's falling-out after Anas insisted that the dream of a global jihad was unattainable.

He was interviewed for the Adam Curtis documentary The Power of Nightmares, which aired in 2004.

He has been granted political asylum to live in London, England.

== Books ==
- Anas, Abdullah. To The Mountains: My Life in Jihad, from Algeria to Afghanistan with Tam Hussein (co-author); Hurst Publ., April 2019. ISBN 978-1-78738-011-0.
