= The Power of Nightmares =

BBC television documentary series

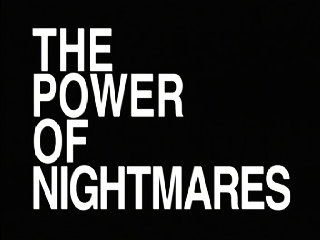
- Title screen
- Written by: Adam Curtis
- Directed by: Adam Curtis
- Narrated by: Adam Curtis
- Country of origin: United Kingdom
- Original language: English
- No. of series: 1
- No. of episodes: 3

Production
- Executive producers: Stephen Lambert; Peter Horrocks
- Producers: Adam Curtis; Lucy Kelsall
- Running time: 180 mins (in three parts)
- Production company: BBC

Original release
- Network: BBC Two
- Release: 20 October – 3 November 2004

Related
- The Century of the Self (2002); The Trap (2007)

The Power of Nightmares: The Rise of the Politics of Fear is a BBC television documentary series by Adam Curtis. It mainly consists of archive footage, with Curtis narrating. The series was originally broadcast in the United Kingdom in 2004. It has subsequently been aired in multiple countries and shown at various film festivals, including the 2005 Cannes Film Festival.

The film compares the rise of the neoconservative movement in the United States and the radical Islamist movement, drawing comparisons between their origins, and remarking on similarities between the two groups. More controversially, it argues that radical Islamism as a massive, sinister organisation, specifically in the form of al-Qaeda, is a myth, or noble lie, perpetrated by leaders of many countries—and particularly neoconservatives in the U.S.—in a renewed attempt to unite and inspire their people after the ultimate failure of utopian ideas.

The Power of Nightmares was praised by film critics in Britain and the United States. Its message and content have also been the subject of various critiques and criticisms from conservatives and progressives.

== Synopsis ==
=== Part 1. "Baby It's Cold Outside" ===
The first part of the series discusses the origins of Islamism and neoconservatism. It shows Egyptian civil servant Sayyid Qutb, depicted as the founder of modern Islamist thinking, visiting the U.S. to learn about its education system, then becoming disgusted at what he judged to be the corruption of morals and virtues in western society through individualism. When he returns to Egypt, he is disturbed by westernisation under Gamal Abdel Nasser and becomes convinced that in order to save his own society, it must be completely restructured along the lines of Islamic law while still using western technology. He then becomes convinced that his vision can only be accomplished through use of an elite "vanguard" to lead a revolution against the established order. Qutb becomes a leader of the Muslim Brotherhood and, after being tortured in one of Nasser's jails, comes to believe that western-influenced leaders can be justifiably killed to remove their corruption. Qutb is executed in 1966, but he influences Ayman al-Zawahiri, the future mentor of Osama bin Laden, to start his own secret Islamist group. Inspired by the 1979 Iranian revolution, Zawahiri and his allies assassinate Egyptian president Anwar Al-Sadat in 1981 in the hopes of starting their own revolution. However, the revolution does not materialise, and Zawahiri comes to believe that a majority of Muslims have been corrupted, not only by their western-inspired leaders, but Muslims themselves have been affected by jahiliyyah and thus may be legitimate targets of violence if they refuse to join his cause. They continued to believe that a vanguard was necessary to rise up and overthrow the corrupt regime and replace it with a 'pure' Islamist state.

At the same time in the United States, a group of disillusioned liberals, including Irving Kristol and Paul Wolfowitz, look to the political thinking of Leo Strauss after the perceived failure of President Johnson's "Great Society". They conclude that an emphasis on individual liberty was the undoing of Johnson's plans. They envisioned restructuring America by uniting the American people against a common evil, and set about creating a mythical enemy. These factions, the neoconservatives, came to power during the 1980s under the Reagan administration, with their allies Dick Cheney and Donald Rumsfeld. They alleged that the Soviet Union was not following the terms of a disarmament treaty between the two countries, and together with the outcomes of "Team B", they built a case using dubious evidence and methods to prove it to Ronald Reagan.

=== Part 2. "The Phantom Victory" ===
In the second part, Islamist factions, rapidly falling under the more radical influence of Zawahiri and his rich Saudi acolyte Osama bin Laden, join the neoconservative-influenced Reagan administration to combat the Soviet Union's invasion of Afghanistan. When the Soviets eventually pull out of Afghanistan, and when the Eastern Bloc begins to collapse in 1989, both the Islamists and the neoconservatives believe they are the primary architects of the Soviet Union's demise. Curtis argues that the Soviet Union was on the verge of collapsing anyway. However, the Islamists see it quite differently. In their triumph, they believe they have the power to create 'pure' Islamic states in Egypt and Algeria. Attempts to create such Islamic states are blocked by force. The Islamists then try to foment revolutions in Egypt and Algeria by using terrorism to scare the people into rising up against their leaders. But the people are terrified by the violence, and the Algerian government exploits that fear as a way to hang on to power. In the end, the Islamists declare the entire populations of the countries to be thoroughly contaminated by western values. Finally, in Algeria, they begin to turn on each other, each believing that members of other terrorist groups are not true Muslims.

In America, neoconservative aspirations to use the United States' military power to further destroy evildoers are thrown off track by the election of George H. W. Bush to the presidency, followed by the election in 1992 of Bill Clinton which left them totally out of power. The neoconservatives, along with their conservative Christian allies, attempt to demonize Clinton throughout his presidency with various real and fabricated stories of corruption and immorality. To their disappointment, the American people do not turn against Clinton. Meanwhile, Islamist attempts at revolution end in massive bloodshed, leaving the Islamists without popular support. Zawahiri and bin Laden flee to the relative safety of Afghanistan and declare a new strategy. To fight Western-inspired moral decay, they must deal a blow to its source: the United States.

=== Part 3. "The Shadows in the Cave" ===
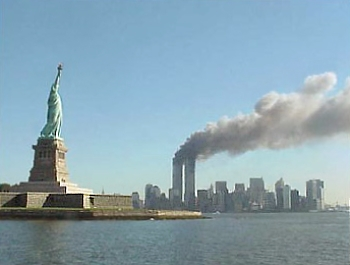
The neoconservatives use the 11 September attacks, with al-Fadl's description of al-Qaeda, to launch the war on terror.

The final part addresses the actual rise of al-Qaeda. Curtis argues that, after their failed revolutions, bin Laden and Zawahiri had little or no popular support, let alone a serious complex organisation of terrorists, and were dependent on independent operatives to carry out their new call for jihad. However, the film argues that in order to prosecute bin Laden in absentia for the 1998 U.S. embassy bombings, U.S. prosecutors had to prove that he is the head of a criminal organisation responsible for the bombings. They find a former associate of bin Laden, Jamal al-Fadl, and pay him to testify that bin Laden is the head of a massive terrorist organisation called "al-Qaeda". With the September 11 attacks, neoconservatives in the new Republican administration of George W. Bush use this invented concept of an organisation to justify another crusade against a new enemy, culminating in the launch of the war on terror.

After the American invasion of Afghanistan fails to uproot the alleged terrorist organisation, the Bush administration focuses inwards, searching unsuccessfully for terrorist sleeper cells in America. In 2003, they extend the war on terror to a war on general perceived evils with the invasion of Iraq. The ideas and tactics also spread to the United Kingdom, where Tony Blair uses the threat of terrorism to give him a new moral authority. The repercussions of the neoconservative strategy are also explored, with an investigation of indefinitely-detained terrorist suspects in Guantanamo Bay, many allegedly taken on the word of the anti-Taliban Northern Alliance without actual investigation on the part of the United States military, and other forms of "preemption" against non-existent and unlikely threats made simply on the grounds that the parties involved had the potential to become a threat. Curtis specifically attempts to allay fears of a dirty bomb attack, and concludes by reassuring viewers that politicians will eventually have to concede that some threats are exaggerated and others have no foundation in reality. He says, "In an age when all the grand ideas have lost credibility, fear of a phantom enemy is all the politicians have left to maintain their power."

== Contributors ==
- John Calvert, historian of Islamism
- Prof. Harvey Mansfield, Straussian philosopher, Harvard University
- Prof. Stanley Rosen, pupil of Leo Strauss, 1949
- Dr Azzam Tamimi, Institute of Islamic Political Thought
- General Fouad Allam, interrogator, Interior Ministry 1958–87
- Roxanne Euben, political scientist
- Irving Kristol, American journalist
- William Kristol, Chief of Staff to the Vice President 1988–92
- Prof. Stephen Holmes, political philosopher
- Henry Kissinger (interviewed 1975)
- Melvin Goodman, Head of Office, Soviet Affairs, CIA 1976–87
- Prof. Richard Pipes, adviser to President Reagan 1980–83
- Dr Anne Cahn, Arms Control and Disarmament Agency 1977–80
- Omar Azzam, cousin of Ayman al-Zawahiri, Egyptian al-Qaeda leader
- Dr Kamal Habib, founder member of Islamic Jihad
- Gilles Kepel, historian of Islamist Movement
- Paul Weyrich, religious activist; member of Republican Party
- Michael Ledeen, Special Adviser to the US Secretary of State 1981–82
- Jack Wheeler, Adviser to the Reagan administration 1981–84
- Richard Perle, Assistant Secretary of Defense 1981–87; Chairman of Pentagon Defense Policy Board 2001–03
- Milton Bearden, CIA Field Officer, Afghanistan 1985–89
- Abdullah Anas, General Commander, Afghan Arabs, Northern Afghanistan 1984–89
- Mikhail Gorbachev, General Secretary, Soviet Communist Party (archive)
- Saif Al Banna, senior member of Muslim Brotherhood, Egypt (archive)
- Ali Haroun, Algerian Minister for Human Rights 1991–92 (archive)
- Essam el-Erian, senior member of Muslim Brotherhood, Egypt
- Brent Scowcroft, National Security Adviser to President George Bush Snr (interviewed 1996)
- Michael Lind, journalist and former neoconservative
- David Brock, author, Blinded by the Right
- Judge Robert Bork, senior member, Federalist Society
- Joe Conason, writer, The Hunting of the President
- Jason Burke, author, Al-Qaeda: Casting a Shadow of Terror
- Sam Schmidt, defence lawyer at US Embassy Bombings trial
- Vincent Cannistraro, Head of Counter-terrorism, CIA 1988–90
- Paul Wolfowitz, US Deputy Secretary of Defense
- Prof. David Cole, law professor, Georgetown University
- Ron Hansen, reporter, The Detroit News
- William Swor, defence lawyer at Detroit Sleeper Cell trail
- John Molloy, defence lawyer at Lackawanna Cell trial
- Bill Durodié, Director, International Centre for Security Analysis, Kings College
- Dr John Prados, National Security Archive, Washington
- Dr Theodore Rockwell, nuclear scientist
- Lewis Z. Koch, Bulletin of the Atomic Scientists
- David Johnston, Intelligence Specialist, New York Times

== Content ==
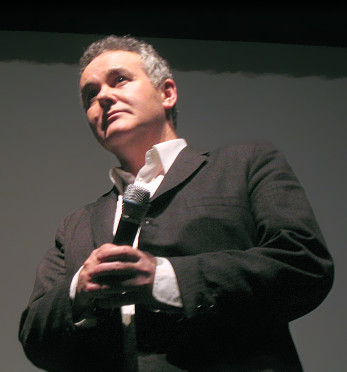
Adam Curtis, the director of The Power of Nightmares

Adam Curtis originally intended to make a film about conflict within the conservative movement between the ideologies of neoconservative "elitism" and the more individualist libertarian factions. During his research into the conservative movement, Curtis discovered what he saw as similarities in the origins of the neoconservative and Islamist ideologies. The topic of the planned documentary shifted to these other two ideologies, with the libertarian element eventually being phased out. Curtis first pitched the idea of a documentary on conservative ideology in 2003 and spent half a year researching the film. Final recordings were made on 10 October, 19 October and 1 November 2004.

As with many of Curtis's films, The Power of Nightmares uses a montage of stock footage taken from the BBC archives which Curtis narrates. Curtis has credited James Mossman as the inspiration for his montage technique, which he first employed for the 1992 series Pandora's Box, while his use of humour has been credited to his first work with television as a talent-scout for the magazine programme That's Life! Curtis has also compared the entertainment aspect of his films to the Fox News channel in America, claiming that the network is successful because of "[their viewers] really enjoying what they're doing."

To help drive his points, Curtis uses interviews with various political and intellectual figures. In the first two parts, former Arms Control and Disarmament Agency member Anne Cahn and former American Spectator writer David Brock accuse the neoconservatives of knowingly using false evidence of wrongdoing in their campaigns against the Soviet Union and President Bill Clinton. Jason Burke, author of Al-Qaeda: Casting a Shadow of Terror, comments in The Shadows in the Cave on the failure to expose a massive terrorist network in Afghanistan. Additional interviews with major figures are added to drive the film's narrative. Neoconservatives William and Irving Kristol, Richard Pipes, Richard Perle and Michael Ledeen are invited to provide a neoconservative view of the film's subject. The history of Islamism is discussed by the Institute of Islamic Political Thought's Azzam Tamimi, political scientist Roxanne Euben, and Islamist Abdullah Anas.

The film's soundtrack includes at least two pieces of music from the films of John Carpenter, who Curtis credited as inspiration for his soundtrack arrangement techniques, as well as tracks from Brian Eno's Another Green World. The film also repeatedly uses Frank Loesser's song "Baby, It's Cold Outside," both to evoke Sayyid Qutb's experience of American culture, and as an ironic accompaniment to footage of dancing Islamists which Curtis described as "designed to undercut this completely unreasoned fear of Islamism". There is also music by composers Charles Ives and Ennio Morricone, while Curtis has credited the industrial band Skinny Puppy for the "best" music in the films.

== Airings and distribution ==
The Power of Nightmares was first broadcast in three parts on BBC Two in 2004 in the United Kingdom, beginning with 'Baby it's Cold Outside' on 20 October, 'The Phantom Victory' on 27 October, and 'The Shadows in the Cave' on 3 November. The murder of Kenneth Bigley led the BBC to cease publicising the final episode prior to its airing. It was broadcast again over three days in January 2005, with the third part updated to note the Law Lords ruling from the previous December that detaining foreign terrorist suspects without trial was illegal.

In May 2005, the film was screened in a 2½ hour edit at the Cannes Film Festival. Pathé purchased distribution rights for this cut of the film.

By 2008, the film had yet to be aired in the United States. Curtis has remarked on this failure,

Something extraordinary has happened to American TV since September 11. A head of the leading networks who had better remain nameless said to me that there was no way they could show it. He said, 'Who are you to say this?' and then he added, 'We would get slaughtered if we put this out.' When I was in New York, I took a DVD to the head of documentaries at HBO. I still haven't heard from him.

Although the series has never been shown on U.S. television, its three parts were shown on 26 February 2005 as part of the True/False Film Festival in Columbia, Missouri, with a personal appearance made by Curtis. It has also been featured at the 2006 Seattle International Film Festival and the San Francisco International Film Festival, the latter awarding Curtis their Persistence of Vision Award. The film was also screened at the Tribeca Film Festival in New York, and there was a brief theatrical run in New York City in 2005.

The film was first aired by CBC in Canada in April 2005, and again in July 2006. The Australian channel SBS had originally planned to air the series in July 2005, but it was cancelled, reportedly in light of the London bombings of 7 July. It was ultimately aired in December, followed by Peter Taylor's The New Al-Qaeda under the billing of a counter-argument to Curtis.

In April 2005, Curtis expressed interest in releasing an official DVD because of popular demand, but noted that his montage technique created serious legal problems with getting such a release approved. An unofficial DVD release was made in the quarterly DVD magazine Wholphin over three issues.

== Reaction ==
=== Critical reaction ===
The Power of Nightmares received generally favourable reviews from critics. Rotten Tomatoes reported that 88% of critics gave the film positive write-ups, with an average score of 8.1/10, based upon a sample of 8 reviews. At Metacritic, which assigns a normalised rating out of 100 to reviews from mainstream critics, the film received an average score of 78, based on six reviews, indicating "generally favorable reviews". Entertainment Weekly described the film as "a fluid cinematic essay, rooted in painstakingly assembled evidence, that heightens and cleanses your perceptions" while Variety called it "a superb, eye-opening and often absurdly funny deconstruction of the myths and realities of global terrorism." The San Francisco Chronicle had an equally enthusiastic view of the film and likened it to "a brilliant piece in the Atlantic Monthly that's (thankfully) come to cinematic life." The New York Times had a more skeptical review, unimpressed by efforts to compare attacks on Bill Clinton by American conservatives with Islamist revolutionary activities, claiming (in a review by literary and film critic A. O. Scott) that, "its understanding of politics, geo- and national, can seem curiously thin." In May 2005, Adam Curtis was quoted as saying that 94% of e-mails to the BBC in response to the film were supportive.

The film won a BAFTA Award in the category of Best Factual Series in 2005. Other awards were given by the Director's Guild of Great Britain and the Royal Television Society.

=== Political reaction ===
Progressive observers were particularly pleased with the film. Common Dreams had a highly positive response to the film, comparing it to the "red pill" of the Matrix series, a comparison Curtis appreciated. Commentary in The Village Voice was also mostly favorable, noting, "As partisan filmmaking, it is often brilliant and sometimes hilarious – a superior version of Syriana." The Nation, while offering a detailed critique on the film's content, said of the film itself "[it] is arguably the most important film about the 'war on terrorism' since the events of September 11."

Among conservative and neoconservative critics in the United States, The Power of Nightmares has been described as "conspiracy theory", anti-American or both. David Asman of FoxNews.com said, "We wish we didn't have to keep presenting examples of how the European media have become obsessively anti-American. But they keep pushing the barrier, now to the point of absurdity." His views were shared by commentator Clive Davis, ending his commentary on the film for National Review by saying, "British producers, hooked on Chomskyite visions of 'Amerika' as the fount of all evil, are clearly not interested in even beginning to dig for the truth." Other commentators have variously described the film as pushing a conspiracy theory. Davis and British commentator David Aaronovitch both explicitly labelled the film's message as a conspiracy theory, with the latter saying of Curtis "his argument is as subtle as a house-brick." Attacks in this vein continued after the 7 July 2005 London bombings, with the Christian Broadcasting Network referencing the film as a source for claims by the "British left" that "the U.S. war on terror was a fraud", and the Australia Israel & Jewish Affairs Council calling it "the loopiest, most extreme anti-war documentary series ever sponsored by the BBC." In The Shadows in the Cave, Curtis emphasises that he does not discount the possibility of any terrorist activity taking place, but that the threat of terrorism had been greatly exaggerated. He responded to accusations of creating a conspiracy theory by saying he believes the alleged use of fear as a force in politics is not the result of a conspiracy but rather the subjects of the film "have stumbled on it."

Peter Bergen, writing for The Nation, offered a detailed critique of the film. Bergen wrote that even if al-Qaeda is not as organised as the Bush administration stressed, it is still a very dangerous force due to the fanaticism of its followers and the resources available to bin Laden. On Curtis's claim that al-Qaeda was a creation of neoconservative politicians, Bergen said, "This is nonsense. There is substantial evidence that Al Qaeda was founded in 1988 by bin Laden and a small group of like-minded militants, and that the group would mushroom into the secretive, disciplined organisation that implemented the 9/11 attacks." Bergen further claimed that Curtis's arguments serve as a defence of Bush's failure to capture bin Laden in the 2001 invasion of Afghanistan and his ignoring warnings of a terrorist attack prior to 11 September.

Additional issues have been raised over Curtis's depiction of the neoconservatives. Davis's article in National Review showed his displeasure with Curtis's depiction of Leo Strauss, claiming, "In Curtis's world, it is Strauss, not Osama bin Laden, who is the real evil genius." Peter Bergen claimed the film exaggerated the influence of Strauss over neoconservatism, crediting the political philosophy more to Albert Wohlstetter. A 2005 review on Christopher Null's Filmcritic.com took issue with Curtis's retelling of the attacks on Bill Clinton in 'The Phantom Victory', crediting these more to the American religious right than the "bookish university types" of the neoconservative movement.

Daniel Pipes, a conservative American political commentator and son of Richard Pipes who was interviewed in the film, wrote that the film dismisses the threat posed by Communism to the United States as, in Pipes' words, "only a scattering of countries that had harmless Communist parties, who could in no way threaten America." Pipes noted that the film adopts this conclusion without mentioning the Comintern, Julius and Ethel Rosenberg, Klaus Fuchs or Igor Gouzenko.

Allegations have been made of omissions in the history described by the film. The absence of discussion of the Israeli–Palestinian conflict was noticed by some viewers. Davis claimed that Leo Strauss's ideas had been formed by his experiences in Germany during the Weimar Republic, and alleged that the film's failure to mention this was motivated by a wish to portray Strauss as concerned with American suburban culture, like Qutb.

=== Comparisons to Fahrenheit 9/11 ===
After its release, The Power of Nightmares received multiple comparisons to Fahrenheit 9/11, American filmmaker Michael Moore's 2004 critique of the first four years of George W. Bush's presidency of the United States. The Village Voice directly named The Power of Nightmares as, "the most widely discussed docu agitprop since Fahrenheit 9/11." The Nation and Variety both gave comments lauding Curtis's film as superior to Fahrenheit and other political documentaries in various fields; the former cited Curtis's work as being more "intellectually engaging" and "historically probing", while the latter cited "balance, broad-mindedness and sense of historical perspective." Moore's work has also been used as a point of comparison by conservative critics of Curtis.

Curtis has attempted to distinguish his work from Moore's film, describing Moore as "a political agitprop film-maker," arguing that, "you'd be hard pushed to tell my politics from watching [The Power of Nightmares]."

== See also ==
- Culture of fear
- Bitter Lake (2015)
- The Century of the Self (2002)
- The Living Dead (1995)
- The Mayfair Set (1999)
- Pandora's Box (1992)
- The Trap (2007)
