= Bill Durodié =

British academic

Professor Bill Durodié
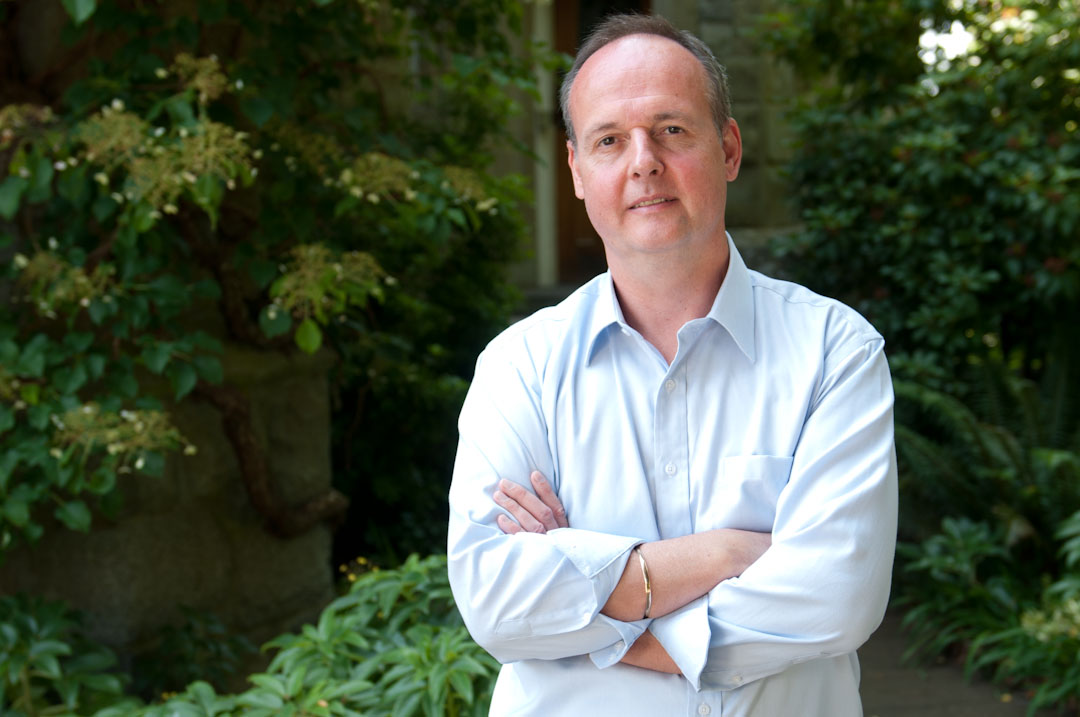
- In Victoria, British Columbia, Canada, July 2012

Professor Bill Durodié is a Professor of Politics, Languages and International Studies at the University of Bath, UK, as well as a former head of department there.

== Education ==
Durodié was educated at the Royal College of Science, part of Imperial College London, where he studied Physics. After completing a final year undergraduate project to map different types of supernovae onto the Morphological Catalogue of Galaxies, he was invited to start a PhD in Astronomy at the University of Manchester under the supervision of Franz Daniel Kahn. His first research publication was in theoretical astrophysics, based on a paper he presented at Princeton University in 1986.

== Early career ==
He then changed course, first pursuing a career in teaching (becoming Head of Maths at two inner-city comprehensive schools) and then urban regeneration (working in both the public and private sectors). During this time he also studied for a Master's degree in European Social Policy at the London School of Economics, and subsequently embarked on another PhD, this time in Politics, at the University of Oxford.

In 2007, he completed his doctorate in Risk Communication through the Centre for Decision Analysis and Risk Management in the School of Health and Social Sciences of Middlesex University (UK).

== As a professor ==
His inaugural professorial lecture, The Politics of Risk and Resilience – Fear and Terror in a World without Meaning, was delivered on 29 October 2015.

In the debate around the 2016 United Kingdom European Union membership referendum, rejecting all of the official campaigns, he argued on the grounds of democratic accountability and moral autonomy for the UK to give up its membership of the European Union. Eurasia Review reported that he told them that soon after the vote that, despite the largest mandate in British history, politicians and others would seek to deliver Brexit in name alone, but not in spirit.

He was formerly Professor in the School of Humanitarian Studies at Royal Roads University in Victoria, British Columbia, where he was Program Head for the Conflict Analysis and Management programs. He maintains an on-going role as an Associate Faculty member there. Before that he held positions coordinating the Homeland Defence research programme and then the Health and Human Security research programme within the S. Rajaratnam School of International Studies of Nanyang Technological University in Singapore, as well as in the Department of Defence Management and Security Analysis at Cranfield University, part of the Defence Academy of the United Kingdom at Shrivenham, and in the War Studies Group of King's College London.

In 2014 he was appointed as a Visiting Professor to CELAP, the China Executive Leadership Academy in Pudong, one of China's top four national 'Party Schools', in Shanghai. The position was renewed in 2018. He has also conducted short courses for officials through the Shanghai Administration Institute, and writes on the West's evolving relations with China, as well as events surrounding the protests in Hong Kong. He was an Associate Fellow of the International Security Programme at Chatham House in London for over a decade.

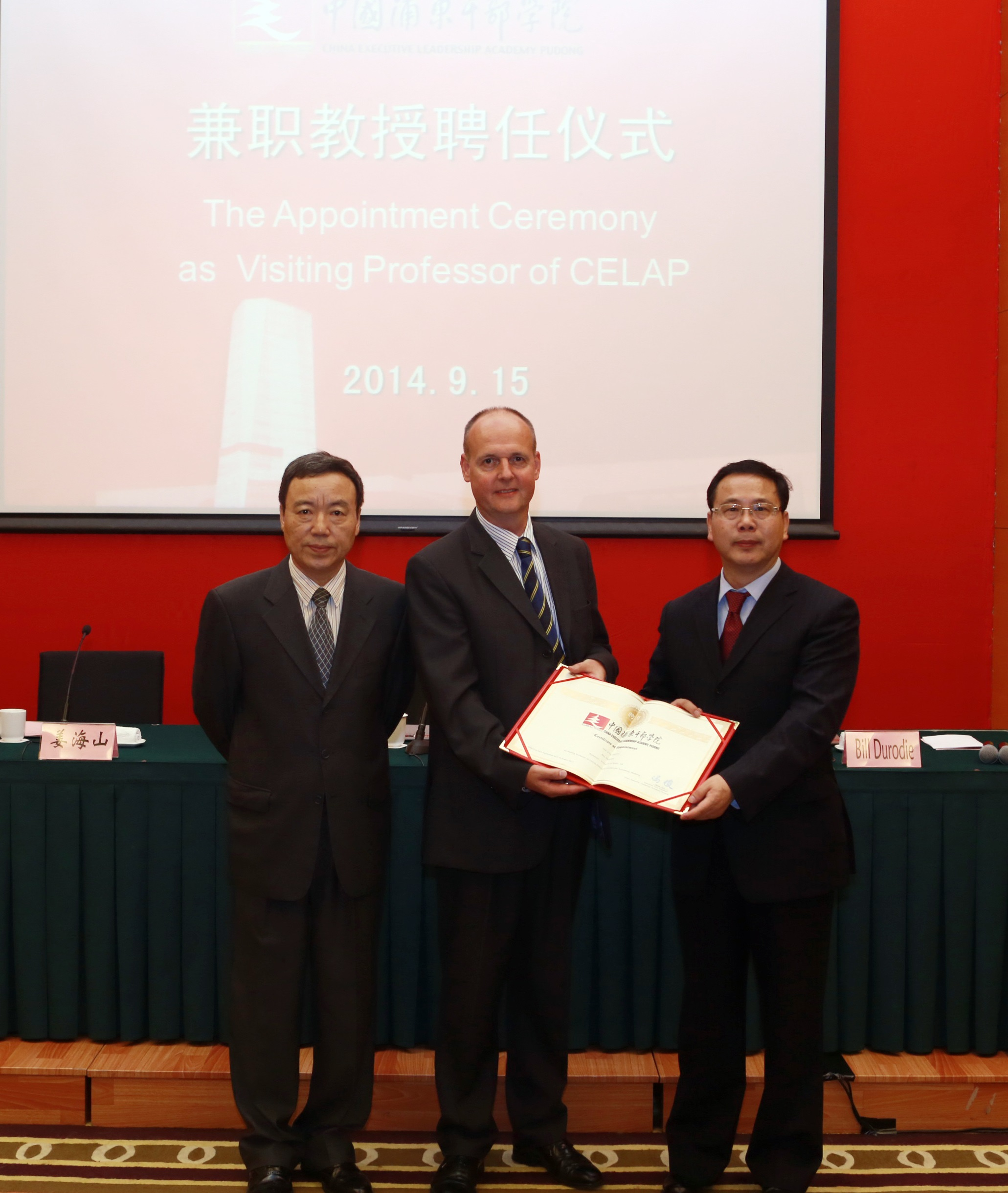
Appointed as a Visiting Professor to the Shanghai National Party School, China, September 2014.

His main research interest is to examine the causes and consequences of contemporary perceptions of risk, as well as how these are framed and communicated across a wide range of contemporary social issues. His work explores the limitations of risk management and of the so-called precautionary principle. He has questioned the motivations behind the growing demand to engage the public in dialogue and decision-making in relation to science. He has also sought to draw attention to the parallels between Islamist terrorism and contemporary Western nihilism, noting that many who engage in the former draw their roots from the latter and specifically stating that 'Islam, for them at least, was more a motif than a motive'.

He publicly defended the need for BP to continue its exploration work in the Gulf of Mexico at the time of the Deepwater Horizon oil spill, and he supported the initial response of the Japanese authorities to the Fukushima Daiichi nuclear power plant emergency. On the other hand, he has questioned the dynamic behind environmental campaigns against pulp and palm-oil producers in Indonesia, as well as the British government's interpretation of the implications of the 2011 England riots.

His work proposes that Securitization (international relations) theory is too limited a framework through which to understand the British government's new Prevent Duty. This latter imposes new obligations on public bodies to tackle so-called Radicalization, which he proposes is better understood as being driven by a process of disengagement. He has also addressed what he sees as the demise of strategic thinking and a concomitant crisis of diplomacy, most recently evidenced by the responses of senior British government ministers to the Sergei Skripal, former-spy poisoning episode in the UK.

His 2011 articles investigating how the World Health Organization addressed the 2009 flu pandemic, anticipated the cultural and institutional responses to COVID-19 which, he proposed, would lead to considerably more fatalities than the virus itself. His concern since, was that the episode would lead to: "suspicion, avoidance and intolerance towards others, an unwillingness to embrace life’s uncertainties, fear of future emergencies, a dystopian, anti-human outlook and narrative, and all too willing acceptance of the curtailment of civil liberties, combined with a paralysing dependence on others".

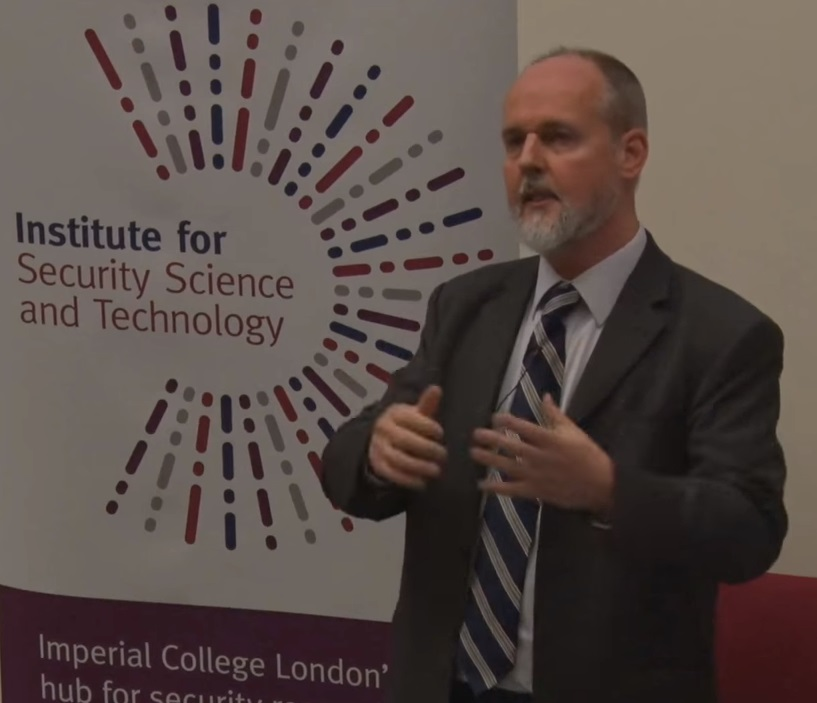
Giving the Vincent Briscoe Annual Security Lecture, Imperial College London, November 2017.

== Publications ==
His publication list includes articles in academic journals, and on the reading lists of various universities – as well as a media profile from both writing press commentaries and appearing in broadcasts.

He featured in the 2004 BBC British Academy of Film and Television Arts award-winning documentary series produced by Adam Curtis; 'The Power of Nightmares: The Rise of the Politics of Fear'. The Guardian newspaper journalist Madeleine Bunting to describe him as: "one of the most perceptive commentators featured in the series".

== Manifesto Club ==
Durodié was one of the founding members of the Manifesto Club, a network of individuals originally established to celebrate human achievement and challenge social, cultural and political pessimism, closely associated with the Spiked network of organisations emerging from the defunct Revolutionary Communist Party. He is a regular speaker at Spiked's annual Battle of Ideas festival in London, and is a regular contributor to Spiked's website.

He gave the opening key-note address to the Society for Risk Analysis Europe Conference in 2016. On 15 November 2017, following in the steps of former US Secretary for Homeland Security Michael Chertoff and the UK Minister of State for Universities and Science David Willetts, he became the 8th person and first alumnus to give the annual Vincent Briscoe Lecture to the Institute for Security Science and Technology at Imperial College London.

== Selected journal articles ==
- A twenty-first century Maginot Line: The EU’s Defence Readiness Roadmap 2030, MCC Brussels briefing, December 2025
- How the EU Strangles Innovation: Thirty years of precaution, MCC Brussels briefing, October 2024
- What Does Europe Fear? Understanding the hopes and fears of Europeans, MCC Brussels briefing, September 2023
- The Hollow Flag: the gulf between EU security rhetoric and real security, MCC Brussels briefing, February 2023
- Scientists advise, ministers decide? The role of scientific expertise in UK policymaking during the coronavirus pandemic, Journal of Risk Research, Vol.25, No.10, 2022
- Handling Uncertainty and Ambiguity in the COVID-19 Pandemic, Psychological Trauma: Theory, Research, Practice, and Policy, Vol.12, S1, 2020
- Terrorism and post-traumatic stress disorder: a historical review, The Lancet Psychiatry, Vol.6, No.1, 2019
- Theory informed by practice. Application informed by purpose. Why to understand and manage risk, cultural context is the key, Safety Science, Vol.99, No.2, 2017
- Remaking Bandung 60 Years On, Global Change, Peace & Security, Vol.28, No.3, 2016
- Securitising Education to Prevent Terrorism or Losing Direction?, British Journal of Educational Studies, Vol.64, No.1, 2016
- War on Terror or a Search for Meaning?, US Joint Chiefs of Staff/Department of Defence Strategic Multi-Layer Assessment Occasional White Paper, September 2013
- The Changing Nature of Riots in the Contemporary Metropolis: From Ideology to Identity, Journal of Risk Research, Vol.15, No.4, 2012
- H1N1 – The Social Costs of Élite Confusion, Journal of Risk Research, Vol.14, No.5, 2011
- Reconciling Growing Energy Demand with Climate Change Management, Global Change, Peace & Security, Vol.23, No.2, 2011
- H1N1 – The Social Costs of Cultural Confusion, Global Health Governance, Vol.4, No.2, 2011
- Human Security – A Retrospective, Global Change, Peace & Security, Vol.22, No.3, 2010
- Fear and Terror in a Post-Political Age, Government & Opposition, Vol.42, No.3, 2007
- Suicide Bombers v Sexual Abusers: A Battle of Depravity or Western Fixations?, Security Journal, Vol.20, No.3, 2007
- Risk and the Social Construction of 'Gulf War Syndrome', Philosophical Transactions of the Royal Society B, Vol.361, No.1468, 2006
- Public Panic and Morale: World War Two Civilian Responses Re-Examined in the Light of the Current Anti-Terrorist Campaign, (with Edgar Jones, Robin Woolven and Simon Wessely) Journal of Risk Research, Vol.9, No.1, 2006
- The Limitations of Risk Management in Dealing with Disaster, Politik, Vol.8, No.1, 2005
- The Concept of Risk, Nuffield Trust Global Programme on Health, Foreign Policy and Security, February 2005
- Facing the Possibility of Bio-Terrorism, Current Opinion in Biotechnology, Vol.15, No.3, 2004
- Civilian Morale during World War Two: Responses to Air-Raids Re-Examined, (with Edgar Jones, Robin Woolven and Simon Wessely), Social History of Medicine, Vol.17, No.3, 2004
- Limitations of Public Dialogue in Science and the Rise of New 'Experts', Critical Review of International Social and Political Philosophy, Vol.6, No.4, 2003
- The True Cost of Precautionary Chemicals Regulation, Risk Analysis, Vol.23, No.2, 2003
- Resilience or Panic? The Public's Response to a Terrorist Attack, (with Simon Wessely) The Lancet, Vol.360, No.9349, 2002
