= Michael Springmann =

American consular official

J. Michael Springmann (b. 1945) was the head of the American visa bureau in Jeddah, Saudi Arabia, in the Reagan and former Bush administrations, from September 1987 through March 1989. Since 1999 he has worked as an immigration, general practice, family, DUI, and DWI attorney and counselor at law, and is licensed to practice law in Washington, D.C., Maryland, and Virginia. The Law Office of J. Michael Springmann is based in Washington, D.C.

== Education ==
Springmann holds a B.F.S. (Bachelor of Foreign Service) degree from Georgetown University (1967), and a JD from the American University Washington College of Law (1998).

== Claims regarding unqualified visa applicants and firing ==
While stationed in Saudi Arabia, Springmann was "ordered by high level State Dept officials to issue visas to unqualified applicants". Springmann states that these applicants were terrorist recruits of Osama bin Laden, who were being sent to the United States in order to obtain training from the CIA. Springmann issued complaints to "higher authorities at several agencies," but they have gone unanswered, and his experiences were not mentioned in the 9/11 Commission Report. The State Department has stated that the consular officer (Jay Phillip Freres, who served as U.S. Consul General in Jeddah from 1986 to 1989) had final authority in issuing the visas, not Springmann.

From cited CBC Interview:

CBC: And when you questioned them, what would they say were their reasons for expecting to get a visa with such slight credentials? Springmann: There was one instance of two Pakistanis who came to me, and they wanted to get to an American auto parts trade show. They couldn't name the show, and they couldn't name the city in which it was going to be held. And then the case officer came over and called me on the phone, and said, "Give them a visa". I said "No, it doesn't wash". "Well, we need it, I'm sorry." Then he went to the head of the consular section and got me overruled, and they got their visas. But when I complained to the powers in the consulate, and the people in Riyadh, I was told to keep quiet, that there was reasons for doing this, that it wasn't a case of my poor judgment, it was this and it was that. This simply fueled my suspicions that something untoward was going on.

Following Springmann's complaints, he was fired by the State Department.

== Writings ==
Springmann is also the author of Goodbye, Europe? Hello, Chaos?: Merkel's Migrant Bomb (2017), in which he argues that "US foreign policy created the crisis. Destabilizing nations through invasion and espionage furthers US goals in the Middle East, he argues, creating migrant waves guided northward and westward to destabilize the European Union in general and Germany in particular. Germany’s own refugee program, designed to exploit migrants as cheap labor, made US intelligence efforts all the easier." (Quoted from summary at the book's entry at Worldcat).

== Bibliography ==
- Springmann, J. Michael (2014). Visas for Al Qaeda; CIA handouts that rocked the world: an insider's view. Washington, DC: Daena Publications. pp. xviii, 263. ISBN 978-0-9909262-0-7. OCLC 1004341231.
- Springmann, J. Michael (2017). Goodbye, Europe? Hello, chaos? : Merkel's migrant bomb. Washington, DC: Daena Publications LLC. ISBN 9780990926221. OCLC 1011422391.
- Springmann, Michael J. (1972). American-Russian economic relations, 1943-1947 (M.A. thesis at 'Catholic University of America'). OCLC 52760807.
