= Body of water (disambiguation) =

Body of water is an accumulation of water on the surface of a planet.

Body of water may also refer to:

- Body of Water (2011 film), a Finnish drama film
- Body of Water (2020 film), a British drama film
- Body of Water (musical), a 2014 musical
- Bodies of Water, an American band
- Phytotelma, a body or reservoir of water held by a plant
- Bodies of Water, an extended play from American band Make Do and Mend
- Waterbodies (band), a garage rock band
