= Rosie Kay Dance Company =

Contemporary dance company

Rosie Kay Dance Company (RKDC) is an independent contemporary dance company based in Birmingham, UK. RKDC is a new member of Arts Council England's National Portfolio of regularly funded organisations for the 2018-22 period and focuses on creating dance that reflects on current, political subjects alongside a community engagement programme. Founder, and artistic Director of RKDC, Rosie Kay, was selected to choreograph the handover ceremony of the 2018 and 2022 Commonwealth Games broadcast to a billion people worldwide, with the latter being in Birmingham, where the company is based. RKDC was awarded 'Best Independent Dance Company', with its production 5 Soldiers being nominated for 'Best Choreography' at the National Dance Awards 2015. In 2022 Rosie Kay resigned from the company and created a new company called K2CO.

== History ==
The company was founded in 2004 (22 years ago) by West Midlands-based choreographer Rosie Kay. Kay worked with producer Hannah Sharpe between 2004 and 2014 in running and developing the company. In 2014 producer James Preston joined Rosie Kay Dance Company as Executive Director with the pair first meeting at the Edinburgh Festival Fringe whilst Kay was performing her piece The Wild Party in 2006. In 2018, RKDC became one of Arts Council England's National Portfolio Organisations.

=== Transition to K2CO ===
Rosie Kay resigned from the company, Rosie Kay Dance Company following an investigation after claims were made by her dancers regarding Kay's views on gender & biological sex.

The Times reads... Kay asked them to define non-binary. At that she says several male dancers shouted that she was a bigot and a terf. Kay said that she supported single-sex spaces, especially because in 2019 in a dance studio’s gender-neutral changing rooms she saw “women and girls getting undressed and in the middle a young man dancing about with his penis out. I was too shocked to complain".

In July 2022, Kay launched the K2CO dance company. Company members will sign a commitment to freedom of expression, the Charter of Creation, that the workplace will be "a safe space where we are free to express our thoughts and feelings without fear of being silenced, shut down or cancelled". Artist Jess de Wahls and Jan Teo, past head of the Birmingham Royal Ballet, will sit on the board. Kay said that K2CO will stage a version of Orlando, with a woman in the lead role.

== Major works ==
=== 5 Soldiers ===
The inspiration for 5 Soldiers came in 2007, after Rosie Kay suffered a knee injury whilst working on a dance piece. The experience of having an acquired physical impairment whilst working in an industry that is so physically demanding, caused Kay to consider the parallels with soldiers who are injured whilst on active duty. This was compounded by a dream she had at the time that she had had one of her legs blown off. Kay told Dance Tabs:

"While my body was my (dancer's) identity, by losing parts of it I did not lose myself. Switching on the TV the following morning, I was confronted yet again with images of more soldiers killed in Iraq. I stopped and looked at them, the dreamed memory of the battlefield still within me, and I saw and felt the connection between the dancer's body and the soldier's body."

As field research, Kay trained with the 4th Battalion of The Rifles in the British Army, experiencing full battle exercises. The show initially debuted in 2010 but its re-staging in 2015/16 is when it won widest acclaim. It was nominated for Best Choreography at the 2015 edition of the National Dance Awards. It also garnered considerable critical praise, attaining 5 stars in the Observer, the Independent and The Herald and 4 stars in The Guardian. It was included in the Best Dance Charts 2015 for all three publications. Writing separately in The Guardian, Judith Mackrell said: "in its humane, unsparing study of modern army life, [5 Soldiers] has taken Kay's choreography, and dance as a whole, into radically uncharted territory." 5 Soldiers was unusual in the fact that it toured not only to traditional dance venues, but also to military barracks throughout the UK. Like Kay, for the re-staged work, the company dancers spent time training with the 4th Battalion. The piece is performed by five dancers, four male, one female. The production toured the UK again in 2017, beginning with performances at Edinburgh Festival Fringe taking place in a new venue Army@TheFringe (at Hepburn House Army Reserve Centre) in partnership with Summerhall. Army@TheFringe was set up to explore equality and diversity in military life and initiate conversations about the role of The Army in the 21st Century. The Fringe Review cited it as a 'Highly Recommended Show' while Edinburgh Festival Magazine wrote in its 5 star review "It's easy to think of war as an act that happens between countries or governments which involves technology, intelligence, missiles and drones. This is an important piece that serves as a reminder that no matter how we talk of war, the front line is still made up of ordinary people with hopes and dreams, just like the rest of us".

A performance on 8 September 2017 at an army drill hall in Bloomsbury, central London was the subject of a live-stream, commissioned by The Space and aired on BBC Arts.

=== MK ULTRA ===
In 2017, Rosie Kay Dance Company worked with documentary filmmaker Adam Curtis (known for his films HyperNormalisation, Bitter Lake, The Century of the Self, All Watched Over by Machines of Loving Grace) and Lady Gaga fashion designer Gary Card to create MK ULTRA. The piece takes its name from the CIA mind-control experiments of the 1960s as it explores the conspiracy that these tests have continued into the lives of today's pop culture icons. The show was developed after interviews with students at Coppice Performing Arts School, University of Wolverhampton, Laban CAT, Dance City Newcastle and Déda, with some of these filmed testimonies being incorporated into the projected visuals. When talking about her research, choreographer Rosie Kay told The Guardian, "The under-25s now have a whole system for decoding the imagery of music videos, looking for symbols like thrones, butterflies, checkered floors and bird cages, to see if they're carrying the cult's message and to see which celebrities have been programmed. So much doubt is now being cast on mainstream media, so many people are taking their information from alternative sources".

In 2017, MK ULTRA received 4 stars in The Observer from Luke Jennings, 4 stars in the Financial Times, and the Evening Standard called it 'a rave version of the Masons'. 2018's tour culminates in a performance at London's Southbank Centre on 8 November.

=== Double Points: K ===
In 2008, Kay's piece Double Points: K received 4 stars in The Herald stating " ... an Everest of synchronicity, timing, defined body lines and stamina... For Kay, this choreographic re-interpretation is a triumph." The work was awarded as 'Outstanding Partnership of the Year' chosen by Mary Brennan in Dance Europe's Critics Choice of the Year. The show received five-star reviews in The Herald and Scotland on Sunday and was reviewed by The Times.

=== Romeo + Juliet ===
From 2014 Kay researched with Birmingham young people and on the beat with West Midlands Police to create Romeo + Juliet. The show reimagines Shakespeare's classic tragedy in the hot Birmingham summer of 2021. In this diverse city, young people's family loyalties give way to gang allegiance as teenagers play with adult rules. A party in the park gets out of control sparking rumours, rioting and revenge. In the midst of rivalries, first tastes of freedom and sparks of a full-on first love ignite. Two young lovers are led to their tragic deaths by events they can't control. Romeo + Juliet will premiere at Birmingham Hippodrome in March 2021.

== Full list of works ==
- Asylum (2004)
- The Wild Party (2006)
- Ballet on the Buses (2007)
- Double Points: K (2008) in collaboration with Emio Greco | PC.
- Supernova (2009)
- 5 SOLDIERS – The Body Is The Frontline (2010-2017)
- The Great Train Dance (2011) on the Severn Valley Railway
- There is Hope (2012)
- Haining Dreaming (2013)
- Sluts of Possession (2013)
- MOTEL (2016) in collaboration with Huntley Muir
- MK ULTRA (2016-2018)
- Modern Warrior (2017–18)

Feature Film credits include choreographer for Sunshine on Leith (2013) and Brummoves (2014). 5 SOLDIERS – the film, was exhibited at The Herbert Gallery Coventry, Stadtmuseum Dresden and is in the film collection of la Médiathèque du Centre National de la Danse, Paris.

== Awards ==
Year	Association	Category	Nominated work	Result
2017	National Dance Awards	Best Independent Dance Company	MK ULTRA	Nominated
2017	National Dance Awards	Most Outstanding Female Performance (Modern)	Shelley Eva Haden in MK ULTRA	Nominated
2015	National Dance Awards	Best Independent Dance Company	5 Soldiers	Won
2015	National Dance Awards	Best Choreography (Modern)	5 Soldiers	Nominated
2015	Royal Society of Public Health	Arts and Health award	5 Soldiers	Special Commendation
2013	National Dance Awards	Best Independent Dance Company	n/a	Nominated
2008	Dance Europe Awards	Outstanding Partnership of the Year	Double Points: K	Won (chosen by Mary Brennan in Dance Europe's Critics Choice of the Year)
