= Can't Get You Out of My Head (TV series) =

2021 TV series by Adam Curtis

- Also known as: Can't Get You Out of My Head: An Emotional History of the Modern World
- Genre: Documentary
- Created by: Adam Curtis
- Country of origin: United Kingdom
- Original language: English
- No. of series: 1
- No. of episodes: 6

Production
- Executive producer: Rose Garnett
- Producer: Sandra Gorel
- Running time: 66–120 minutes
- Production company: BBC Film

Original release
- Network: BBC iPlayer
- Release: 11 February 2021

Related
- HyperNormalisation (2016); Russia 1985–1999: TraumaZone (2022)

Can't Get You Out of My Head: An Emotional History of the Modern World is a six-part BBC documentary television series created by Adam Curtis. It was released on BBC iPlayer on 11 February 2021.

== Premise ==
Like many of Curtis' previous works, the documentary explores and links together various topics such as individualism, collectivism, conspiracy theories, national myths, American imperialism, the history of China, artificial intelligence and the failure of technology to liberate society in the way that technological utopians once hoped it might.

== Background ==
Originally titled What Is It That Is Coming?, the series was inspired by the rise of populism in 2016. Curtis wanted to investigate why the critics of Donald Trump and Brexit were unable to offer an alternative vision for the future, and why these sociopolitical circumstances were being continued beyond ethical breaking points.

== Episodes ==
Episodes of Can't Get You Out of My Head
No.	Title	Duration
1	"Bloodshed on Wolf Mountain"	74 minutes
The episode surveys cultural events leading up to the 1960s revolutions: the failure of the British to shed their feelings of supremacy in the wake of the fall of the British Empire, the political crisis in China in the wake of the Great Leap Forward, the beginnings of Discordianism and the rise of conspiracy thinking in the United States. The common theme tying the episode together is the rise of individualism, which while driven by desires for emancipation can be controlled. The title of the episode is taken from the Chinese film Blood on Wolf Mountain, in which Jiang Qing, credited as Lan Ping, appeared.
2	"Shooting and F**king Are the Same Thing"	74 minutes
The continued exploration of the revolutions of the 1960s and 1970s from the points of view of Michael X, Jiang Qing, Afeni Shakur, and the Red Army Faction, and the ways in which they failed in their revolutionary mission. The title of the episode is a quote attributed to Andreas Baader whilst in a Fatah military training camp in Jordan.
3	"Money Changes Everything"	71 minutes
A collage of stories from the early years of neoliberal globalization, organized around the theme of how systems which people think are stable and self-correcting, such as climate and utopian social experiments, have frustrated our expectations. As coal gave way to oil, the organizing power of the miners gave way to that of oil producing states, which empowered bankers lending out petrodollars, and enabled China to redirect its economy to producing cheap consumer goods. Scientists began understanding the workings of the global climate, while Soviet emigrés in the United States were disillusioned by a society that was all about money.
4	"But What If the People Are Stupid"	73 minutes
The emerging idea in the 1970s of a world without borders; non-governmental organisations (NGOs) feel compelled to change the world because, says Curtis, "politicians left and right had become corrupted by power and petty nationalism"; the unintended consequences of sending humanitarian aid to Ethiopia in 1984; the Chinese Communist Party resists calls within China for transparency and cracks down on protesters; resurgent nationalism in Russia and the Balkans after the breakup of USSR and Yugoslavia; a decline of faith in politics by voters in the West leading to politicians favouring big business.
5	"The Lordly Ones"	66 minutes
This episode follows British and US exceptionalism, from their origins in the early 20th century as a way of avoiding the past of chattel slavery, slave trade, and Opium Wars, to how these myths influenced anti-Black and anti-Asian racism, as well as policies of regime change across the world, notably in Iraq. Curtis argues that the US population could ignore the consequences of the Iraq War in part due to consumption of prescription opioids, in part because China responded to the 1997 Asian financial crisis by buying up US debt thus enabling uninterrupted supply of low-cost consumer goods.
6	"Are We Pigeon? Or Are We Dancer?"	120 minutes
Tying the series together. How we have arrived where we are, a populace fearful of the future and how we might change that future.

== Critical reception ==
The Guardian's Lucy Mangan gave the series five out of five stars and called it "dazzling" and "a dense, ambitious triumph". Sarah Carson of the i also rated Can't Get You Out of My Head five out of five stars, describing it as "terrifying" and a "masterpiece". The Independent's Ed Cumming, who gave the series five out of five stars, called it a "fascinating and disorienting" series that "aims to show how radical movements, emerging after the Second World War, were neutralised and co-opted by an establishment determined to maintain the status quo".

James Walton of The Spectator thought the series was just a variation on Curtis's theme of "how hopeless — in both senses — human beings are", deriding it as "incoherent and conspiracy-fuelled", though only having been able to preview four episodes of the six-part series. Ed Power in The Telegraph found the series "completely implausible", awarding it only three out of five stars.

In a sceptical review for Sight & Sound, Hannah McGill wrote: "Curtis practices journalism absent the qualities that give it credibility: specificity, corroboration, consistency. Instead, he serves up a soup of interesting, oddball historical anecdotes, accompanied by a voiceover favouring giant, blurry assertions about how 'we' interact with 'those in power' during the 'strange days' in which we live. Who are “we”? English speakers? Men? BBC viewers? People who watch Adam Curtis documentaries?"
