= Rosie Kay =

British choreographer (born 1976)

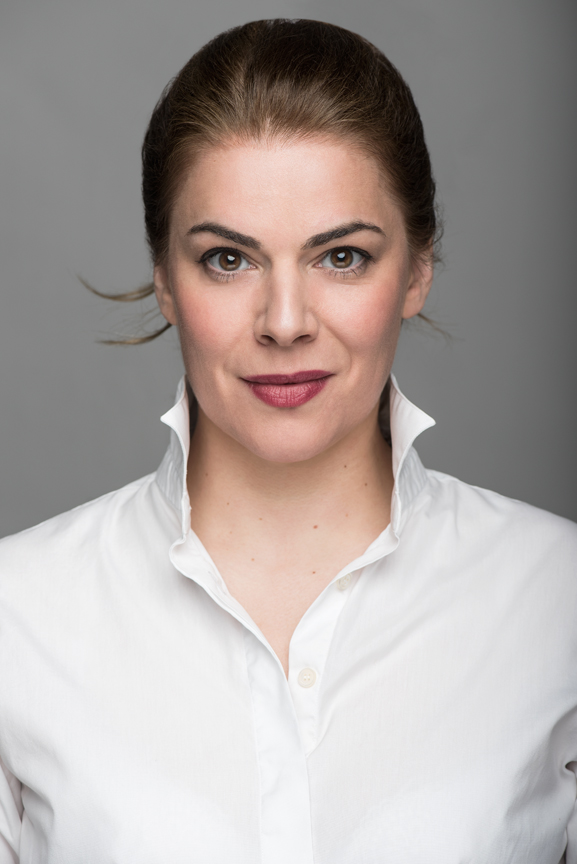
- Born: 27 March 1976 (age 50); Scotland
- Occupation: Choreographer
- Years active: 2004–present
- Website: rosiekay.co.uk

Rosie Kay (born 27 March 1976) is a British choreographer best known for her show 5 Soldiers, MK ULTRA (produced in collaboration with Adam Curtis) and choreographing the handover in the 2018 Commonwealth Games closing ceremony. Kay is the founder and former artistic director of Rosie Kay Dance Company, Associate Artist at Dance City, and a research associate to the University of Oxford School of Anthropology and Museum Ethnography.

== Early life ==
Rosie Kay, born in Scotland and brought up in Devon, began dance classes at the age of three. She trained at London Contemporary Dance School, graduating in 1998.

== Career ==
Rosie Kay first worked as a dancer outside of the UK before founding Rosie Kay Dance Company in 2004.

In 2013, Kay became Leverhulme Artist in Residence at the University of Oxford, using the archive of the Pitts Rivers Museum to create Sluts of Possession with Brazilian dance artist Guilherme Miotto. She worked with the director of The Institute of Social and Cultural Anthropology, Professor Stanley Ulijaszek, research partner Dr Karin Eli, Dr Noel Lobley (ethnomusicologist), Dr Christopher Morton (Curator of Photographs at the Pitt Rivers) and Prof Clare Harris to develop the piece. Performed by Kay and Miotto, Sluts of Possession featured at Dance Base at Edinburgh Festival Fringe, honing in on trance-like states and tribal ritual.

In 2014 producer James Preston joined Rosie Kay Dance Company as executive director, with the pair first meeting at the Edinburgh Festival Fringe whilst Kay was performing her piece The Wild Party in 2006.

In 2015, Rosie Kay's production 5 Soldiers received a Special Commendation from the Royal Society of Public Health's Arts and Health Awards and was nominated for Best Choreography at the National Dance Awards in 2015 whilst the company won Best Independent Dance Company. The show also garnered considerable critical praise, attaining 5 stars in The Scotsman, The Herald, the Observer, the Independent, and 4 stars in The Guardian, and was included in the Best Dance Charts 2015 for the latter three publications. In 2017, it returned to Edinburgh Festival Fringe with a sell-out run presented by Summerhall’s Army@TheFringe and was awarded a Summerhall Jawbone Award for ‘Greatest Festival Moments 2017’. A digital commission from The Space in 2017 enabled a live stream of the show from an Army base in London presented by Sadler's Wells on BBC Arts Online.

In 2015, Kay danced as character Nastya Terpsikhorova and took the role of Movement Director in Irina Brown's stage direction of Shostakovich's Orango at BBC Proms, Royal Albert Hall in London.

MK ULTRA, performed in 2017 is politically focused, the final part of a trilogy beginning with 5 Soldiers (on war) and There Is Hope (on religion). In it, Kay explores themes of surveillance, propaganda, and "total war".

Rosie Kay was chosen as the Choreographer of the Commonwealth Games handover performance as the sporting event transitioned from Australia to Birmingham, UK for the 2018 Commonwealth Games. The choreography was put together in ten days and was televised live to an estimated one billion people globally, in a performance that also included the longest ever single-camera shot of a live handover. The performance featured Birmingham Royal Ballet's principal dancer Céline Gittens and blended ballet, street, jazz and contemporary dance. Approximately 1,500 volunteers auditioned to take part with 500–600 participating in the live show.

In April 2018, Rosie Kay Dance Company became an Arts Council England National Portfolio Organisation.

Kay is associate director and choreographer for a large-scale adaptation of Woyzeck, with a community cast of 100+ at Birmingham Repertory Theatre as part of Birmingham International Dance Festival 2018.

In September 2021 Romeo + Juliet premiered at Birmingham Hippodrome, and received four further performances in a double-bill with Birmingham Royal Ballet.

Rosie Kay resigned from her company, Rosie Kay Dance Company following an investigation after claims were made by her dancers regarding Kay's views on gender & biological sex.

The Times reads... Kay asked them to define non-binary. At that she says several male dancers shouted that she was a bigot and a terf. Kay said that she supported single-sex spaces, especially because in 2019 in a dance studio’s gender-neutral changing rooms she saw “women and girls getting undressed and in the middle a young man dancing about with his penis out. I was too shocked to complain".

In July 2022, Kay launched the K2CO dance company. Company members will sign a commitment to freedom of expression, the Charter of Creation, that the workplace will be "a safe space where we are free to express our thoughts and feelings without fear of being silenced, shut down or cancelled". Artist Jess de Wahls and Jan Teo, past head of the Birmingham Royal Ballet, will sit on the board. Kay said that K2CO will stage a version of Orlando, with a woman in the lead role.

== Influences ==
=== 5 Soldiers ===
In 2006 Kay experienced a knee injury, with doctors saying that she would never dance again. When recovering from an operation and still feeling the effects of general anaesthetic, she had a vivid dream which inspired the creation of 5 Soldiers: The Body is the Frontline, a piece that tells the story of servicemen and women in the British Army. Recalling the dream, she told The Daily Record:

“I dreamt my leg had been blown off on a desert battlefield. In the dream, my first thought was, ‘Oh s**t’. My second thought was, ‘My body is not my soul, I can chop off my arms and legs and I’d still be me’. I thought, ‘What are the links between dance training and soldiers’ training? Could I understand the way they use their bodies? Could I step into that? How would it feel to change my body in that way? What happens in your mind to take those risks?"

After coming up with the idea for 5 Soldiers, it took her nearly two years to gain an embedded attachment to an infantry battalion. With the support of retired British Army Major General Sir Michael Carleton-Smith, she secured an attachment with 4th Battalion, The Rifles with whom she took part in intensive training on Dartmoor before spending time with medics and injured soldiers the Defence Medical Rehabilitation Unit at Headley Court and Selly Oak in Birmingham (Royal Centre for Defence Medicine). At these army rehab centres, Kay spoke with soldiers who had returned from Afghanistan with complex trauma injuries and multiple amputations. General Nick Parker, KCB, CBE commented on Kay's

“use of dance to help create a complex and nuanced picture of conflict is one of the most innovative and compelling initiatives that I have experienced in the aftermath of Iraq and Afghanistan. It demonstrates how art can be used as a powerful tool in the healing process, how it can touch the extended family of those who have been caught in the horror of battle and how it can send a universal message about the soldier. It is an extraordinary achievement which will make a difference to many people.”MK Ultra

Together with journalist Adam Curtis, Kay interviewed 14- to 25-year-olds from the West Midlands, incorporating some of their testimonies into the piece.

=== Romeo + Juliet ===
"A new re-imagining of Shakespeare’s classic tragedy sets the action in the hot Birmingham summer of 2021. In this diverse city, young people’s family loyalties give way to gang allegiance as teenagers play with adult rules. A party in the park gets out of control sparking rumours, rioting and revenge. In the midst of rivalries, first tastes of freedom and sparks of a full-on first love ignite. Two young lovers are led to their tragic deaths by events they can’t control."

== Personal life ==
Kay is the daughter of Stefan G. Kay OBE and Helen Kay. She has a son, Gabriel and lives in Northfield, Birmingham, with her film-maker husband Louis Price.

== Resignation from Rosie Kay Dance Company ==
In December 2021, The Times published an article regarding Kay's resignation from her own dance company. According to the article, Kay stepped down after complaints were made to the company's board about her views on transgender identity, which she expressed in conversation at a private dinner party she threw in her home for company dancers. The ostensible purpose of the gathering, which took place during rehearsals for the company's production of "Romeo and Juliet." was to "relax and cheer everyone up," although the dancers have claimed that Kay was still acting in the role of their employer. The complaints that ultimately led to Kay's resignation from the company she founded were made by four of the dancers who attended the party, some of whom say they are non-binary.

The conflict leading to the complaints arose during a conversation in which Kay told the party attendees she was working with an LGBT book club and several trans friends to create a new production based on Orlando. According to Kay, "Debate turned heated as we talked about the differences between sex and gender and whether transwomen should be admitted to women’s spaces, such as refuges for victims of domestic violence. I believe in sex-based protections and women’s sex-based rights. Women’s rights and freedom of expression are a cornerstone to my artistic expression." Kay, who says she was raped at 16 by a school friend, says she is gender non-conforming, but that "as a dancer, you live in your body. You are under no illusion about your sex. During periods, you injure more easily. When you ovulate, you're wobbly."

According to the article in The Times, the complaints alleged that Kay was aggressive and had made the dancers uncomfortable by showing them her child's bedroom on a general tour of the house. In an article by the BBC, Kay is alleged to have made comments including: "identifying as non-binary is a cop out", that "allowing trans people to take hormone blockers is creating eunuchs" and that trans women "are a danger to actual women in toilets and only want access to female toilets to commit sexual assault." The complainants also claimed Kay had said that being non-binary is "insane." Kay denies having said this, but acknowledges that she did say, and does believe, that "there is no such sex as non-binary." In response to the complaints made to Rosie Kay Dance Company's board of trustees, the board wrote to the Arts Council and the Charity Commission, telling them that Kay was under investigation for transphobia. The board demanded that Kay be investigated by an external HR consultant, but Kay refused to submit to any investigation "which does not acknowledge my gender-critical beliefs are protected under law." She resigned from the company after seeking legal advice.

On 9 December, Kay said she was exploring whether to pursue "legal routes" to force the company to hand over her intellectual property, which "belongs contractually" to her, and would also be considering whether to pursue a claim for constructive dismissal and discrimination.

On 10 December, six dancers in her former company released an open letter accusing Kay of having created a hostile work environment, saying she had made those statements. The open letter further said that Kay had asked non-binary members of the company to confirm which genitalia they had. Kay denies these allegations, saying that the only talk about "eunuchs" was a reference to Germaine Greer's feminist text The Female Eunuch, and that she was not transphobic, saying that "the presence of males who may falsely say they are transwomen in female toilets can cause trauma to women who have suffered sexual assault, as a significant number of women have."

Kay described her perspective in an essay My body will never be erased, published by UnHerd on 17 December.

Kay said she experienced depression after losing her company, but was encouraged by the support of the author J. K. Rowling, who tweeted: "Rosie, you proved you were ready to lose everything in this fight and I couldn’t admire you more."

== Awards and accolades ==
- 1st Prize Choreography, International Solo Dance Festival Stuttgart
- Award from The Queen as ‘Young Achiever of Scotland’.
- Bonnie Bird New Choreography Award.
- First associate artist of DanceXchange
- First Leverhulme Artist in Residence to the School of Anthropology and Museum Ethnography, University of Oxford, 2013–2014, member of St Cross College.
- Research Associate, University of Oxford, with papers published in Medical Humanities and a book chapter published by Oxford University Press on ‘War and Choreography’.

== List of major works ==
- Asylum (2004)
- The Wild Party (2006)
- Ballet on the Buses (2007)
- Double Points: K (2008) in collaboration with Emio Greco | PC.
- Supernova (2008)
- 5 SOLDIERS – The Body Is The Frontline (2010–2017)
- The Great Train Dance (2011) on the Severn Valley Railway
- There is Hope (2012)
- Haining Dreaming (2013)
- Sluts of Possession (2013)
- MOTEL (2016) in collaboration with Huntley Muir
- MK ULTRA (2016–2018)
- Modern Warrior (2017–18)
- Choreography of Commonwealth Games handover (2018)
- Artemis Clown (2018–19)
- 10 Soldiers (2019)
- Absolute Solo II (2021)
- Romeo + Juliet (2021)

Feature Film credits include choreographer for Sunshine on Leith (2013) and Brummoves (2014). 5 SOLDIERS – the film, was exhibited at The Herbert Gallery Coventry, Stadtmuseum Dresden and is in the film collection of la Médiathèque du Centre National de la Danse, Paris.
