= Alexei Yurchak =

Professor of anthropology at the University of California, Berkeley

- Алексей Владимирович Юрчак
- Born: Alexei Vladimirovich Yurchak; July 21, 1960 (age 66); Leningrad, Russian SFSR, Soviet Union

Academic background
- Education: Duke University

Academic work
- Discipline: Anthropologist
- Institutions: University of California, Berkeley
- Notable works: Everything Was Forever, Until It Was No More: The Last Soviet Generation

Alexei Vladimirovich Yurchak (Russian: Алексей Владимирович Юрчак; born 21 July 1960) is a Russian-born American anthropologist and professor of anthropology at the University of California, Berkeley. His research concerns the history of the Soviet Union and post-Soviet transformations in Russia and the post-Soviet states.

== Early life and education ==
Yurchak was born and raised in Leningrad (present-day Saint Petersburg), Soviet Union. He was trained as a physicist and managed a local musical group, AVIA. He then moved to the United States, where he received his Ph.D. in cultural anthropology from Duke University in 1997.

== Hypernormalization ==
Science fiction authors and brothers Arkady and Boris Strugatsky described the reality Alexei Yurchak would later coin as hypernormalisation in their 1971 novel Roadside Picnic which inspired the 1979 movie "Stalker".

Yurchak coined the term "hypernormalization" in his 2005 book Everything Was Forever, Until It Was No More: The Last Soviet Generation. The book focused on the political, social and cultural conditions during what he terms "late socialism" (the period after Stalinism but before perestroika, mid-1950s – mid-1980s) which led to the dissolution of the Soviet Union in 1991.

In 2007, Everything Was Forever won the Wayne S. Vucinich Book Prize from the Association for Slavic, East European, and Eurasian Studies.

Yurchak rewrote the book in Russian, expanding and revising it considerably. It was published in 2014 by Moscow's New Literary Observer and won the 2015 Enlightener Prize in the Humanities category.

In 2016 British filmmaker Adam Curtis released his documentary "HyperNormalisation" which re-popularised the term for modern audiences. It received further exposure (and greater resonance) on social media in 2025 given the lingering effects of the COVID-19 pandemic, implacable climate change, and the systemic institutional destruction wrought by the Second Trump administration.

== Publications ==
- Everything Was Forever, Until It Was No More: The Last Soviet Generation. Princeton, New Jersey: Princeton University Press. 2005. ISBN 978-0-691-12117-8.
- Это было навсегда, пока не кончилось. Последнее советское поколение (in Russian). Moscow: New Literary Observer. 2014. ISBN 978-5-4448-0361-5.
