= Worriedaboutsatan =

British electronic band

- Origin: Bradford, England
- Genres: Electronic, post-rock
- Years active: 2006–present
- Labels: Iapetus Recordings (2006–07); Gizeh Records (2008–2010); Past inside the Present
- Members: Gavin Miller
- Past members: Thomas Ragsdale

Worriedaboutsatan (stylized as worriedaboutsatan) is an electronic band that originated in Bradford, West Yorkshire. The band was formed by Gavin Miller in 2006 as a fusion of glitch, techno, electronica, rock and metal, later joined by Tom Ragsdale.

== Origin of name ==
The band's name, Worriedaboutsatan, is taken from a song of the same name by Belgian rock band Deus. It was a B-side of its 1996 single "Theme From Turnpike".

== History ==
The band was composed of Gavin Miller and formerly Tom Ragsdale, who met while both attending Leeds College of Music. Worriedaboutsatan began as a Gavin Miller's side project, but it later became the joint focus of Miller and Ragsdale.

The band's mixture of rock and electronic genres can be attributed to Miller's and Ragsdale's musical influences, which give equal importance to post-rock bands such as Explosions in the Sky and Mogwai as well as electronic dance music artists such as Underworld. Worriedaboutsatan's sound, in reflection of its musical tastes, is in the band's own words, an attempt 'to fuse elements of everything we listen to—glitch, techno, electronica, rock [and] metal'.

Worriedaboutsatan's music has appeared on several BBC Radio shows, including Steve Lamacq's show on BBC 6 Music and Tom Robinson's Introducing and Mary Anne Hobbs' Experimental Show, both on BBC Radio 1. Since 23 July 2008, its music has also been featured in episodes of the British soap opera Coronation Street.

In 2011, the duo launched a new project, Ghosting Season, and put worriedaboutsatan on hold. In 2014, worriedaboutsatan returned and released the single "I'm Not"/"The Next Round".

In June 2019, Thomas left the band to focus on his solo career.

== Releases ==
The first release from the band was a self-titled EP, more commonly known as EP1. It was released in 2006 and is now out of print, although currently available online. The single, "An Infinity of Oncoming Lights" was released in 2006.

The second EP, entitled EP02, was released in late 2007 to a largely positive critical response, with solid recommendation from Traffic magazine (March 2008). The track "Relative Minors" featured the vocals of local singer-songwriter Paul Marshall. It was mastered at Transition Studios, who have also worked with Burial and Kode9.

The band's debut album, Arrivals, was released on 25 May 2009, on Gizeh Records. It has received good critical response, including a 7.6 score on Pitchfork. A remix album, Arrivals Remixed was released in December 2009. and a single, "Heart Monitor" followed in 2010.

After a four-year absence, "I'm Not"/"The Next Round" was released on the This is it Forever label in March 2014. On 16 March 2015, the band released its first album in six years, titled Even Temper, followed by the album Blank Tape a year later, tracks from which appeared in the Adam Curtis BBC documentary HyperNormalisation.

On 4 October 2019, the one-piece band released its sixth studio album, named Blind Tiger.

== Live shows ==
The band started out using a desktop PC with the software package Reason to run the electronic elements, while the two members either played guitar or controlled the PC via a MIDI controller. This changed in 2008 to using an iMac with the software package Ableton Live. The band now use two laptops: Ragsdale's runs the electronic elements via Ableton Live, while Miller's runs the software package Guitar Rig, through which he plays live guitar.

Earlier shows found the band performing on the floor with the audience instead of the stage, which gave Ragsdale the ability to walk out into the crowd while playing guitar. However, later performances saw the role of guitarist given solely to Miller, while Ragsdale took control of the computer and electronic elements.

Among the many bands that Worriedaboutsatan have performed with include 65daysofstatic, iLiKETRAiNS, Dälek, Yndi Halda, Ólafur Arnalds, and Maybeshewill.

== Discography ==
=== Albums ===
- 2009: Arrivals
- 2009: Arrivals Remixed
- 2015: Even Temper
- 2016: Blank Tape
- 2019: Revenant
- 2019: Blind Tiger
- 2020: Crystalline
- 2020: Time Lapse
- 2021: Providence
- 2021: Circles I
- 2021: Circles II
- 2022: Bloodsport
- 2022: Glass Infinites
- 2023: Falling But Not Alone
- 2023: I Hope You Like The Bundesliga
- 2023: The Pivot
- 2023: The Clouds Just Eventually Roll On And No-one Remembers Anything
- 2024: JÆJA
- 2024: If Not Now, When?
- 2024: Ricochet
- 2025: The Future Can Wait
- 2025: Subtle Manoeuvers
- 2026: No Knock, No Doorbell
- 2026: Outland

=== EPs ===
- 2006: Worriedaboutsatan (aka EP1) You Are Not Stealing Records
- 2007: EP02
- 2018: Shift

=== Singles ===
- 2006: "An Infinity of Oncoming Lights"
- 2010: "Heart Monitor"
- 2014: "I'm Not"/"The Next Round"
- 2015: "The Woods"/"Blood"
- 2018: "Volte"/"They Are In Our House Now"
- 2018: "Who Is A Hunter?"/"Cloaking"
