= BBC Film =

British film production company

- Formerly: BBC Films (1990–2020)
- Industry: Film
- Founded: 18 June 1990; 36 years ago
- Founders: David M. Thompson
- Headquarters: Broadcasting House, London, England
- Area served: United Kingdom
- Key people: Rose Garnett; Eva Yates
- Products: Motion pictures
- Services: Film
- Owner: BBC
- Parent: BBC
- Subsidiaries: Storyville; iFeatures (with Creative England, the British Film Institute and ScreenSkills); Microwave (with Film London and the British Film Institute); BBC Earth Films (with BBC Earth)
- Website: bbc.co.uk/bbcfilm

BBC Film (formerly BBC Films) is the feature film-making arm of the BBC. It was founded on 18 June 1990, and has produced or co-produced between eight to fifteen films a year, working in partnership with major international and UK distributors.

Originally based in Mortimer Street, London. The company was founded as a wholly owned but independent film-making company by Mark Shivas as part of the Drama Department. David M. Thompson became its head in 1997.

A restructuring in 2007 integrated BBC Films into the main BBC Fiction department of BBC Vision. As a result, it moved out of its independent offices into BBC Television Centre, and Thompson left to start his own film production company. BBC Film has been based at Broadcasting House in London since 2013. The company changed its name to BBC Film in 2020.

In 2022 Eva Yates became head of BBC Film, responsible for the development and production slate, strategy and business operations.

== Filmography ==
=== 1990s ===
1990s productions
Year	Title	Notes
1990	Truly, Madly, Deeply	
1990	Antonia and Jane	with Miramax Films
1991	Enchanted April	
1991	Edward II	
1991	The Reflecting Skin	
1992	Sarafina!	
1993	The Hawk	
1993	The Snapper	
1993	Much Ado About Nothing	co-produced with American Playhouse Theatrical Films, Renaissance Films
1994	Captives	with Miramax Films & Distant Horizon
1994	The Hour of the Pig	
1995	I.D.	
1995	Angus	
1995	Cold Comfort Farm	
1996	Jude	
1996	Small Faces	
1996	Twelfth Night: Or What You Will	
1996	Shine	
1997	Twenty Four Seven	
1997	I Went Down	
1997	My Son the Fanatic	
1997	Love and Death on Long Island	
1997	Mrs Dalloway	
1997	Mrs Brown	
1997	The Relic	
1998	Gods and Monsters	
1998	Hard Rain	
1998	A Simple Plan	
1998	Black Dog	
1998	The Governess	
1998	Love Is the Devil: Study for a Portrait of Francis Bacon	
1999	A Room for Romeo Brass	
1999	Mansfield Park	
1999	Man on the Moon	
1999	RKO 281	

=== 2000s ===
2000s productions
Year	Title
2000	Wonder Boys
2000	Wild About Harry
2000	Saltwater
2000	Maybe Baby
2000	Billy Elliot (with Working Title Films)
2000	Shadow of the Vampire (with Saturn Films)
2000	Isn't She Great
2000	Last Resort
2001	Iris (with Miramax Films and Intermedia)
2001	Born Romantic
2001	About Adam
2001	The Claim
2001	Lara Croft: Tomb Raider
2002	Anita and Me
2002	Dirty Pretty Things
2002	In This World
2002	The Heart of Me
2002	Morvern Callar
2002	The Gathering Storm
2003	The Statement
2003	The Mother
2003	Masked and Anonymous
2003	Code 46
2003	I Capture The Castle
2003	Deep Blue
2003	Lara Croft: Tomb Raider – The Cradle of Life
2003	Kiss of Life
2003	Skagerrak
2004	Bullet Boy
2004	Millions
2004	Red Dust
2004	My Summer of Love
2004	The Life and Death of Peter Sellers (with Company Pictures)
2004	Stage Beauty (with Qwerty Films and Tribeca Film)
2004	Trauma
2004	Undone (short)
2004	The Accidental Perfectionist
2005	Opal Dream
2005	Imagine Me & You
2005	Mrs Henderson Presents
2005	A Cock and Bull Story
2005	Match Point
2005	Shooting Dogs (co-production with UK Film Council)
2005	Love + Hate
2005	The Mighty Celt
2005	The Undertaker (short)
2006	Notes on a Scandal
2006	Starter for Ten
2006	Scoop
2006	Fast Food Nation
2006	The History Boys
2006	Confetti
2006	Miss Potter
2006	As You Like It (in association with HBO Films)
2006	Glastonbury
2006	Snow Cake
2006	Life and Lyrics
2006	Shiny Shiny Bright New Hole in My Heart
2006	Shoot the Messenger
2007	Four Last Songs
2007	Eastern Promises (distributed and co-presented by Focus Features)
2007	Becoming Jane
2007	Earth (co-production with Disneynature)
2007	Grow Your Own
2007	Joe's Palace
2007	The Restraint of Beasts
2007	Capturing Mary
2008	Revolutionary Road (co-production with DreamWorks Pictures)
2008	Death Defying Acts
2008	The Duchess
2008	Brideshead Revisited
2008	The Boy in the Striped Pyjamas
2008	The Other Boleyn Girl
2008	The Edge of Love
2008	The Meerkats
2008	Is Anybody There?
2008	Man On Wire (as BBC Storyville)
2008	Shifty
2008	Easy Virtue
2008	Into the Storm: Churchill at War
2009	Nativity!
2009	The Men Who Stare at Goats
2009	Tormented
2009	Frequently Asked Questions About Time Travel
2009	The Damned United (co-production with Columbia Pictures)
2009	In the Loop
2009	Bright Star (co-production with Warner Bros. Pictures, Pathé, Film Finance Corporation Australia, Pathé, UK Film Council, and Screen Australia)
2009	The Boys Are Back (co-production with Miramax Films, Film Finance Corporation Australia, Tiger Aspect Pictures, and Screen Australia)
2009	An Education
2009	Fish Tank
2009	Creation
2009	Glorious 39

=== 2010s ===
2010s productions
Year	Title
2010	The First Grader (co-production with National Geographic Entertainment, Videovision Entertainment, & UK Film Council)
2010	Made in Dagenham
2010	Tamara Drewe
2010	Edge of Darkness (co-production with Warner Bros. Pictures and Icon Productions)
2010	StreetDance 3D (co-production with Phase 4 Films, Vertigo Films, & British Film Institute)
2010	Freestyle (co-production with Phase 4 Films, Revolver Entertainment, Film London Microwave, B19 Media, and UK Film Council)
2010	Africa United
2011	The Awakening
2011	Brighton Rock
2011	West Is West
2011	Jane Eyre
2011	Coriolanus
2011	My Week with Marilyn
2011	Project Nim
2011	The Iron Lady
2011	Salmon Fishing in the Yemen
2011	We Need to Talk about Kevin
2011	One Life (as BBC Earth Films)
2011	The British Guide to Showing Off
2011	Ill Manors
2012	Quartet
2012	Shadow Dancer
2012	Spike Island
2012	Blood
2012	Good Vibrations
2012	Great Expectations
2012	In the Dark Half
2012	A Running Jump
2012	StreetDance 2
2012	Strawberry Fields (co-production with Soda Pictures, Film London Microwave, Kent County Council Film Office, Screen South, Met Film Post, and UK Film Council)
2012	Perfect Sense
2013	Philomena
2013	Saving Mr. Banks (co-production with Walt Disney Pictures)
2013	Dom Hemingway
2013	Alan Partridge: Alpha Papa
2013	Walking with Dinosaurs: The Movie (as BBC Earth Films)
2013	Broken
2013	Exhibition
2013	Flying Blind (co-production with Soda Pictures, iFeatures, Matador Pictures, Southwest Screen, Cinema Six, Regent Capital, The City of Bristol and Ignition Films)
2013	Borrowed Time (co-production with Film London Microwave, UK Film Council and Parkville Pictures)
2013	Big Men
2013	Ginger & Rosa
2013	Now Is Good
2013	London: The Modern Babylon (co-production with Cinedigm, British Film Institute and Nitrate Film)
2013	The Summit
2013	The Sea
2013	Kiss the Water (co-production with Virgil Films, Easy There Tiger, Slate Films, and Creative Scotland)
2013	The Challenger Disaster
2014	A Little Chaos
2014	A Long Way Down
2014	The Invisible Woman
2014	What We Did on Our Holiday
2014	Enchanted Kingdom (as BBC Earth Films, co-production with Reliance Entertainment, IM Global, & Evergreen Studios)
2014	Pride
2014	My Old Lady
2014	Lilting
2014	Mrs. Brown's Boys D'Movie
2015	Far from the Madding Crowd
2015	The Falling
2015	Woman in Gold
2015	Suite Française
2015	Testament of Youth
2015	Mr. Holmes
2015	X+Y
2015	Bill
2015	Brooklyn
2015	The Lady in the Van
2015	Man Up
2015	London Road
2015	Being AP (co-production with Entertainment One, Irish Film Board, Northern Ireland Screen, and Moneyglass Films)
2015	The Face of an Angel
2015	Spooks: The Greater Good
2016	David Brent: Life on the Road
2016	Florence Foster Jenkins
2016	Swallows and Amazons
2016	Denial
2016	My Scientology Movie
2016	A United Kingdom
2016	The Lovers and the Despot (as BBC Storyville)
2016	The Levelling
2016	Notes on Blindness
2016	I, Daniel Blake
2016	The Library Suicides (co-production with Soda Pictures, Edicis Films, S4C, Ffilm Cymru Wales and British Film Institute)
2016	The Lighthouse
2016	The Goob (co-production with Soda Pictures, iFeatures, Creative England, British Film Institute, and EMU Films)
2016	Absolutely Fabulous: The Movie
2017	Viceroy's House
2017	City of Tiny Lights
2017	The Sense of an Ending
2017	Their Finest
2017	Lady Macbeth
2017	Victoria & Abdul
2017	Mindhorn
2017	Breathe
2017	Earth: One Amazing Day (as BBC Earth Films, co-production with Goldcrest Films International & SMG Pictures)
2017	Apostasy
2017	Spaceship (co-production with Breaking Glass Pictures, iFeatures, Creative England, British Film Institute, Belly Productions, Parkville Pictures, and Trinity)
2017	Trophy (as BBC Storyville)
2018	On Chesil Beach
2018	Yardie
2018	The Children Act
2018	The Happy Prince
2018	Out of Blue
2018	In Fabric
2018	Happy New Year, Colin Burstead
2018	Grace Jones: Bloodlight and Bami
2019	Blue Story
2019	Dirty God
2019	Little Joe
2019	Stan & Ollie
2019	Sorry We Missed You
2019	The Aftermath
2019	The Boy Who Harnessed the Wind
2019	The Souvenir
2019	The White Crow
2019	Monsoon
2019	Judy
2019	Be Still My Beating Heart (co-production with Creative Scotland, Scottish Film Talent Network, & barry crerar)
2019	Nomad: In the Footsteps of Bruce Chatwin
2019	They Shall Not Grow Old
2019	Horrible Histories: The Movie – Rotten Romans

=== 2020s ===
2020s productions
Year	Title
2020	Never Rarely Sometimes Always
2020	The Nest
2020	Surge
2020	His House
2020	Mogul Mowgli
2020	Misbehaviour
2020	The Roads Not Taken
2020	Ammonite
2020	Supernova
2020	Lynn + Lucy
2020	Aisha and Abhaya (co-production with Royal Opera House, Rambert Dance Company, Arts Council England, & Robin Saunders)
2021	After Love
2021	The Mauritanian
2021	True Things
2021	Ear for Eye
2021	The Power of the Dog
2021	Pirates
2021	The Souvenir Part II
2021	The Phantom of the Open
2021	Cow
2021	Body of Water (co-production with Verve Pictures, Film London Microwave, British Film Institute, Lions Den Films, Bright Shadow Films, and Boudica Films)
2021	Here Before
2021	Herself
2021	The Year Earth Changed
2021	9/11: Inside the President's War Room
2021	River
2021	Can't Get You Out of My Head (documentary series)
2021	People Just Do Nothing: Big in Japan
2022	Aisha
2022	Ali & Ava
2022	Benediction
2022	God's Creatures
2022	Aftersun
2022	Triangle of Sadness
2022	The Lost King
2022	Allelujah
2022	The Eternal Daughter
2022	The Boy, the Mole, the Fox and the Horse (short)
2022	Russia 1985–1999: TraumaZone (documentary series)
2023	Girl
2023	Blue Jean
2023	Medusa Deluxe
2023	Rye Lane
2023	Scrapper
2023	Club Zero
2023	Femme
2023	The Old Oak
2023	In Camera
2023	Silver Haze
2023	Sweet Sue
2023	Silent Roar
2023	Chuck Chuck Baby
2023	Tuesday
2023	Janet Planet
2023	Hoard
2023	One Life
2023	The End We Start From
2023	The Great Escaper
2023	The Iron Claw
2024	The Outrun
2024	Made in England: The Films of Powell and Pressburger
2024	Edge of Summer
2024	Bird
2024	On Becoming a Guinea Fowl
2024	Santosh
2024	September Says
2024	Lollipop
2024	Harvest
2024	The Salt Path
2024	On Falling
2024	The Severed Sun
2025	Dreamers
2025	Christy
2025	Urchin
2025	My Father's Shadow
2025	Pillion
2025	Sentimental Value
2025	Ish
2025	Hamlet
2025	Straight Circle
2025	The Choral
2025	Palestine 36
2025	The Son and the Sea
2025	Retreat
2026	Peaky Blinders: The Immortal Man
2026	The Fall of Sir Douglas Weatherford
2026	I See Buildings Fall Like Lightning
2026	The End of It
2026	Ghosts: The Possession of Button House

=== Upcoming ===
- Chork
- Flesh
- Fonda
- Mission
- Pretend I'm Not Here
- The Entertainment System Is Down
- The Roots Manoeuvre

== See also ==
- BBC
  - BBC Studios
- Film4 Productions – British film production company
