= Shifty =

Shifty may refer to:

== Music ==
- Shifty, a 2012 EP by Cassie Steele
- Shifty Records, a former South African anti-apartheid record label
- Shifty Records (United States), an American record label specializing in metal

== People ==
- Shifty Henry, American musician John Henry (1921–1958)
- Darrell Powers (1923–2009), American non-commissioned officer in World War II, nicknamed "Shifty"
- Shifty Shellshock, stage name of American nu metal/hip hop singer Seth Binzer (1974–2024), co-founder and co-leader of the band Crazy Town
- Jim West (baseball) (1911–1970), American Negro league first baseman nicknamed "Shifty Jim"

=== Fictional characters ===
- Shifty, a fictional character in the series Happy Tree Friends
- Shifty Dingo, a fictional character in the series The Adventures of Blinky Bill
- Cousin Shifty, a fictional character in the series Bread

== Other uses ==
- Shifty (film), a 2008 British urban thriller, from writer/director Eran Creevy
- Shifty (TV series), a television series by Adam Curtis
