= HyperNormalisation =

2016 documentary film by Adam Curtis

- Title card
- Written by: Adam Curtis
- Directed by: Adam Curtis
- Country of origin: United Kingdom
- Original language: English

Production
- Producer: Sandra Gorel
- Running time: 166 minutes
- Production company: BBC
- Budget: US$80,000

Original release
- Release: 16 October 2016

Related
- Bitter Lake (2015); Can't Get You Out of My Head (2021)

HyperNormalisation is a 2016 BBC documentary by British filmmaker Adam Curtis. It argues that following the global economic crises of the 1970s, governments, financiers and technological utopians gave up on trying to shape the complex "real world" and instead established a simpler "fake world" for the benefit of multi-national corporations that is kept stable by neoliberal governments. The film was released on 16 October 2016 on BBC iPlayer.

== Etymology ==
The word hypernormalisation was coined by Alexei Yurchak, a professor of anthropology who was born in Leningrad and later went to teach at the University of California, Berkeley. He introduced the word in his book Everything Was Forever, Until It Was No More: The Last Soviet Generation (2006), which describes paradoxes of Soviet life during the 1970s and 1980s. He says everyone in the Soviet Union knew the system was failing, but no one could imagine any alternative to the status quo, and politicians and citizens alike were resigned to maintaining the pretense of a functioning society. Over time, the mass delusion became a self-fulfilling prophecy, with everyone accepting it as the new norm rather than pretend, an effect Yurchak termed hypernormalisation. It has since gained further resonance in the social media era in 2025 in the U.S.

== Chapters ==
The film contains nine chapters and is composed primarily of montage with voice-over.

=== 1975 ===
The fiscal crisis in New York City and the emergent idea that financial systems could run society; shuttle diplomacy between then-US Secretary of State Henry Kissinger and Middle Eastern leaders in the Arab-Israeli dispute and the subsequent retreat by Hafez al-Assad of Syria; the onset of hypernormalisation in the Soviet Union.

=== The Human Bomb ===
Following the United States' involvement in the 1982 Lebanon War, a vengeful al-Assad made an alliance with Ruhollah Khomeini of Iran. They planned to force the US out of the Middle East by encouraging civilians to carry out suicide bombings on American targets in the region, thereby avoiding reprisals. In February 1984, the US withdrew all its troops from Lebanon because, in the words of then-US Secretary of State George P. Shultz, "we became paralysed by the complexity that we faced".

=== Altered States ===
By the mid-1980s, banks and corporations were connecting through computer networks to create a hidden system of power and putative technological utopians, whose roots went back to the counterculture of the 1960s and libertarianism; they also saw the Internet as an opportunity to make an alternative world free of political and legal restraints.

=== Acid Flashback ===
John Perry Barlow's vision of cyberspace was the 1990s equivalent of the Acid Tests. Barlow had been part of the LSD (also known as "acid") counterculture in the 1960s and founded the Electronic Frontier Foundation. He wrote a manifesto called A Declaration of the Independence of Cyberspace. Addressed to politicians, it declared "the global social space we are building to be naturally independent of the tyrannies you seek to impose upon us". Two computer hackers, Phiber Optik and Acid Phreak, knew that in reality corporations were using the internet to exert more control over the lives of people than governments had done in the past, and they demonstrated that hierarchies did exist online by obtaining Barlow's credit record from TRW Inc. and posting it on the internet.

=== The Colonel ===
This chapter describes the Reagan administration using Muammar Gaddafi as a pawn in their public relations (PR) strategy of creating a simplified, morally unambiguous foreign policy by blaming him for the 1985 Rome and Vienna airport attacks and the 1986 Berlin discotheque bombing that killed US soldiers, both of which European security services attributed to Syrian intelligence agencies. Gaddafi is described as playing along for the sake of increasing his profile in the Arab world as a revolutionary. The 1986 United States bombing of Libya, 10 days after the disco bombing, is described as an operation carried out mainly for PR reasons, because attacking Syria would have been too risky.

=== The Truth Is Out There ===
This chapter begins with a montage of unidentified flying object (UFO) sightings recorded by members of the public in the United States. It argues that the phenomenon surrounding UFOs in the 1990s was born out of a counter-intelligence operation designed to make the public believe that secret airborne high-technology weapons systems tested by the US military during and after the Cold War were alien visitations. Top secret memos forged by the United States Air Force Office of Special Investigations were allegedly leaked to ufologists who spread the manufactured conspiracy theory of a government cover-up to the wider public. The method, called perception management, aimed to distract people from the complexities of the real world. American politics are described as having become increasingly detached from reality. Curtis uses the collapse of the Soviet Union at the end of the 1980s as an example of an event that took the West by surprise because reality had become less and less important. A Jane Fonda workout video is shown to illustrate that socialists had given up trying to change the real world and were instead focusing on the self and encouraging others to do the same, though it is notable that Fonda used the profits from these videos to fund activism. The video is intercut with footage of Nicolae Ceaușescu and his wife, Elena, being executed by firing squad and buried following the Romanian Revolution in 1989.

=== Managed Outcomes ===
Ulrich Beck is identified as a left-wing German political theorist. After the collapse of the Soviet Union, he saw the world as too complex to change, and Beck asserted that politicians should merely keep the West stable by predicting and avoiding risks. Curtis looks at Aladdin, a computer system produced by BlackRock that manages about 7% of the world's financial assets, analysing the past to anticipate what may happen in the future; and how anti-depressant drugs and social media both stabilise the emotions of individuals.

=== A Cautionary Tale ===
The start of this chapter is about the flaws of trying to predict the future by using data from the past. Curtis tells the story of how a card counter was recruited by Donald Trump to analyse the gambling habits of Akio Kashiwagi at his casino, the Trump Taj Mahal in Atlantic City, after Trump had lost millions of dollars to Kashiwagi. In an effort to avert the impending bankruptcy of the casino, a model was devised that predicted a way of recouping the money from Kashiwagi, who lost US$10 million. However, before he could pay, he was killed by yakuza gangsters and the casino went bankrupt, with Trump having to sell many of his assets to the banks.

Attention turns back to the Middle East and the Lockerbie Bombing in 1988. Curtis says that immediately after the bombing, journalists and investigators blamed Syria for carrying out the attack on behalf of Iran in revenge for the shooting down of Iran Air Flight 655 by the United States Navy. (Note: Lebanese involvement has also been suggested.) It was generally accepted as true until US security agencies announced that Libya was behind the attack. Some journalists and politicians believed that the West had made the volte-face to appease Syria's leader, who the US and the United Kingdom required as an ally in the coming Gulf War.

He focuses on the spread of suicide bombing tactics from Shia to Sunni Islam and the targeting of civilians in Israel by Hamas during the 1990s. The resulting political paralysis led to a stalling of the Israeli–Palestinian peace process. It is described as an unintended consequence of Israel's response to the 1992 killing of an Israeli border guard.

A montage is shown of clips from pre-9/11 disaster films in which New York City landmarks are variously destroyed by alien invaders, meteorites, and a tsunami. Curtis argues that such films were characteristic of a mood of uncertainty that pervaded the United States at the end of the 20th century.

Curtis shows how Muammar Gaddafi was turned into the West's "new best friend."

=== A World Without Power ===
The effect of the Iraq war wreaks havoc on the American psyche and people retreat into cyberspace. Judea Pearl creates Bayesian networks that mimic human behaviour. Judea's son, Daniel Pearl is the first American to be beheaded on a video uploaded to YouTube.

Meanwhile, social media algorithms show information that is pleasing to their users and hence does nothing to challenge their beliefs. Despite this, Occupy Wall Street emerges in an attempt to disrupt the system by imitating the leaderless system that the internet was once imagined to become. Using a similar method, the Egyptian revolution of 2011 commenced.

Britain, France and the US turn their backs on Muammar Gaddafi once Libyans rise up against him. The US drops bombs using drones, and then footage is shown of Gaddafi being captured by rebels.

Neither Occupy Wall Street nor the Arab Spring turn out very well for the revolutionaries.

In Russia, Vladimir Putin and his cabinet of political technologists create mass confusion. Vladislav Surkov uses ideas from art to turn Russian politics into a bewildering piece of theatre. Donald Trump employs the same techniques in his first 2016 presidential campaign by using language from Occupy Wall Street. Curtis asserts that Trump "defeated journalism" by rendering its fact-checking abilities irrelevant.

The American Left's attempt to resist Trump on the internet had no effect. In fact, they were just feeding the social media corporations who valued their many additional clicks.

Syria's revolution becomes more vicious and violent. The technique of suicide bombing that Curtis argues Hafez al-Assad introduced in order to unite the Middle East has instead torn it apart. Russia uses Surkov's concept of "non-linear warfare" to fight against the Syrian rebels. Russia claims to leave Syria, but doesn't.

Abu Musab al-Suri in Syria suggests that terrorists should not carry out large-scale attacks such as Osama bin Laden's, but instead carry out "random" small-scale attacks throughout the West to create fear and chaos, against which it would be more difficult to retaliate.

Destabilisation of the West's psyche leads to the vote for Brexit and the popularity of Donald Trump.

== Music ==
Music used at any stage or repeatedly includes:

- Scuba Z – The Vanishing American Family
- Nine Inch Nails – Something I Can Never Have
- Nine Inch Nails - Ghosts I from "Ghosts 2"
- Yanka Dyagileva – My Sorrow is Bright
- Dmitri Shostakovich – Suite for Jazz Orchestra No. 2: VI. Waltz 2, Part 6/8
- Dmitri Shostakovich - 24 Preludes and Fugues (Shostakovich) - Prelude No. 1 in C Major
- Ennio Morricone – Giù la testa
- Ennio Morricone - La Tragedia Di Un Uomo Ridicolo
- Ennio Morricone – Lontano
- Ennio Morricone – The Thing: Humanity, Part 1
- City of Prague Philharmonic Orchestra – Poltergeist: Main Theme
- worriedaboutsatan – Blank Tape
- Thomas Ragsdale – Warning Mass
- Pye Corner Audio – The Black Mill Video Tape
- Gavin Miller – Fotograf (part 2)
- Ghosting Season – Far End of the Graveyard (3am version)
- Suicide – Dream Baby Dream
- Her Name Is Calla - Paying for your funeral
- Burial – In McDonalds
- Burial - Dog Shelter
- Burial – Truant
- Burial - Distant Lights
- Barbara Mandrell – Standing Room Only
- Aphex Twin – Blue Calx
- Brian Eno – On Some Faraway Beach
- Cliff Martinez – I'm in the Pink
- Cliff Martinez - Can I Sit Next to You - Solaris Film soundtrack.
- Clint Mansell – Welcome to Lunar Industries - Moon Film soundtrack.
- John Perry Barlow and Dražen Bošnjak – A Declaration of the Independence of Cyberspace
- Sergei Prokofiev – Symphony No. 1
- Olivier Messiaen – Turangalila Symphony
- Benjamin Britten - Peter Grimes
- Béla Bartók - Bluebeard's Castle

== Clips ==
HyperNormalisation makes extensive use of footage from the BBC Archives and includes material shot specially for the documentary.

== Critical reception ==
The Independent described it as "A rare documentary that respects the viewer's intelligence... Nearly all of the political moments Curtis drops in on are well known, but he recontextualises them in an engrossing way. [He] is to be applauded for making a documentary that, in creating deliberately disorientating world narratives, those in power are trying to prevent". The New Yorker described it as "a searching and essential document of our times, a movie that leaves us, as in its opening shot, groping through a pitch-black forest with only a flashlight, wondering what lies in all that terrifying darkness that no one has found a way through".

In The Guardian, reviewer Charlie Lyne wrote, "[this] 165-minute opus makes a feature of its sheer unwieldiness, as Curtis veers from social history to conspiracy theory via the odd rambling bar-room anecdote, like a man who’s two-dozen browser tabs into a major Wikipedia binge... the film embraces the peculiarities of online viewing, trusting that its audience – if confused – will skip back 20 minutes to refresh their memories, or supplement Curtis’s argument with research of their own." For The Hollywood Reporter, Stephen Dalton wrote, "A rich gumbo of occult conspiracy theory, dystopian science-fiction thriller and Noam Chomsky-style Marxist critique, Hypernormalisation is highly compelling even when its arguments are not wholly convincing... This fascinating assemblage of half-explored ideas should inspire curious viewers to conduct further research of their own, which is an entirely healthy and positive response".

Phil Harrison, in a review for The Quietus, wrote "it could be argued that Curtis himself is just another master manipulator... piecing together a diverting collage out of various picaresque shards of recent history and presenting it as the truth." In Little White Lies, David Jenkins wrote that the film is a "constantly compelling roundelay of political tidbits presented as fragments of a larger, vaguely unfathomable puzzle... The pieces all (just about) fit together, but the image they produce is blurred and indistinct... [Curtis's] wall-to-wall voiceover narration is rife with sweeping statements which act as the teetering tentpoles of his thesis."

== Awards and nominations ==
Year	Association	Category	Nominee(s)	Result
2017	Diversity in Media Awards	Movie of the Year		Nominated

== See also ==
- Bitter Lake
- Potemkin village
