= An Ocean Apart =

- Genre: Documentary
- Theme music composer: Richard McLaughlin
- Country of origin: United Kingdom
- Original language: English
- No. of series: 1
- No. of episodes: 7

Production
- Executive producer: George Carey
- Producer: Adam Curtis
- Running time: 400 mins (in seven parts)
- Production company: BBC

Original release
- Network: BBC One
- Release: 20 April – 1 June 1988

An Ocean Apart is a 1988 BBC television documentary series on British-American relations in the 20th century. Presented by David Dimbleby, it explores the relationship between the United Kingdom and the United States from the First World War to the 1980s, and examines the people, ideas and events that have shaped the mutual history of the two nations. The series was produced by Adam Curtis.

== Background ==
The series took three years to make, and overran its budget. Dimbleby convinced the BBC management to air the series on BBC One, where it could garner a larger audience, rather than on the more highbrow BBC Two. Dimbleby also wrote a book to accompany the series.

== Episodes ==
=== Part 1. 'Hats Off to Mr Wilson' ===
This episode tells how the Americans were dragged reluctantly into the First World War, of their journey across the Atlantic Ocean, their welcome in Liverpool, and their disillusion when the war was over. For the US president, Woodrow Wilson, victory had turned sour, but America had started its journey towards world leadership.

=== Part 2. 'Home in Pasadena' ===
This episode examines the economic relations between Britain and the US during the 1920s and discusses how free trade and mass production techniques after the First World War changed British and American manufacturing and created economic rivalry between the two countries.

=== Part 3. 'Here Come The British! Bang! Bang!' ===
This episode about the 1930s discusses America's reluctance to enter the Second World War on Britain's side. Charles Lindbergh encourages American neutrality, but the US president, Franklin Roosevelt, decides to aid Britain.

=== Part 4. 'Trust Me To The Bitter End' ===
America and Britain ally in the Second World War to defeat Nazi Germany and the other Axis powers. With its development of the atom bomb, American dominance becomes clear.

=== Part 5. 'If You Don't Like Our Peaches, Quit Shaking Our Tree' ===
In a reversal of roles, Britain becomes isolationist and the US becomes a superpower. Britain's dependence on the US becomes clear after the Suez Crisis of 1956.

=== Part 6. 'Under The Eagle's Wing' ===
Britain co-operates with the US during the Cuban Missile Crisis but avoids involvement in the Vietnam War.

=== Part 7. 'Turning Up The Volume' ===
In the 1980s, Britain and the US form an alliance against the Soviet Union.
