= £830,000,000 – Nick Leeson and the Fall of the House of Barings =

1996 film by Adam Curtis

- Also known as: Inside Story Special: £830,000,000 – Nick Leeson and the Fall of the House of Barings
- Directed by: Adam Curtis
- Country of origin: United Kingdom
- Original language: English

Production
- Producer: Adam Curtis
- Cinematography: Michael Eley
- Editor: Olivia Lichtenstein
- Running time: 55 minutes
- Production company: BBC

Original release
- Network: BBC One
- Release: 12 June 1996

Inside Story Special: £830,000,000 – Nick Leeson and the Fall of the House of Barings, sometimes referred to as 25 Million Pounds, is a British television documentary by filmmaker Adam Curtis released on 12 June 1996. It details the collapse of Barings Bank in the mid-1990s due to the machinations of Nick Leeson, who lost £827 million ($1.3 billion) primarily by speculating on futures contracts.

== Summary ==
The film describes Barings as one of the oldest and most prestigious merchant banks in Britain, run by the same family for decades with extensive ties to Britain's elites. However, the Bank harboured a terrible secret. In the late 19th century Barings almost went bankrupt after investing heavily in South American bonds, including backing the construction of a sewer system in Buenos Aires. The bank was saved by The Bank of England, but Edward Baring, the head of the bank, was financially ruined and never recovered.

The documentary explores the culture of Barings and of the financial markets during the 1990s, and how Nick Leeson was able to cause another huge loss of money to the bank, this time bankrupting the company. He did this by claiming fictitious profits on the Singapore International Monetary Exchange, SIMEX, and using money requested from London as margin payments on fictitious trades to finance his loss-making positions.

Leeson, the film suggests, had an "amazing ability to manipulate and deceive those around him" but also points out that Barings "willingly entered into a dream he wove, lured by the prospect of vast sums of money". Leeson, interviewed in jail, argues that he was only able to perpetrate such a massive fraud because many of the senior executives at Barings had no idea how the modern system of finance, which emerged in the 1980s, really worked.

The film details the fates of many of the people who were involved in the scandal, including Peter Baring who "has promised never to work in the City of London again." Hong Kong merchant banker Steven Clarke observes the class-based humour of the downfall of Barings: "For a boy from Watford to bring a grand firm down, I mean it was a social insult as well. It wasn't even one of their own kind."

== Reception ==
British author Lucy Ellmann wrote in The Independent that the film "ridiculed the whole lot of them, the smug bankers, smug Leeson, and the essential dullness of the empire they coveted. The progress of Leeson's fraud was described suspensefully, but the tone was delightfully tongue-in-cheek." Ian Verrender of the Sydney Morning Herald said the film showed Leeson "as the boy from the wrong side of the tracks who always wanted to be rich, famous and successful." He went on to say that "this documentary is as much an insight into the British class system as a financial disaster tale."

Martin Hoyle of the Financial Times opined: "Was he an incompetent sorcerer's apprentice whose losses multiplied as he frantically tried to conceal them? A super spy? A Marlovian overreacher or Nero, burning down Rome for his personal amusement? Whatever your opinion of Neeson, this was no way to run a bank." Matthew Bond wrote in The Times that Adam Curtis, the director, "delivered the outside story, a story which if (and this is a big if) we had bothered to plough through the acres of newsprint dedicated to it, we already knew. That was the bad news. The good news was that Curtis's version was easier, shorter and more fun."
