= Shifty (TV series) =

2025 documentary series by Adam Curtis

- Genre: Montage documentary
- Created by: Adam Curtis
- Written by: Adam Curtis
- Directed by: Adam Curtis
- Country of origin: United Kingdom
- Original language: English
- No. of series: 1
- No. of episodes: 5

Production
- Executive producer: Rose Garnett
- Producer: Sandra Gorel
- Editor: Adam Curtis
- Running time: 66–77 minutes
- Production company: A24

Original release
- Network: BBC iPlayer
- Release: 14 June 2025

Shifty: Living in Britain at the End of the Twentieth Century is a 2025 five-part British documentary television series created by Adam Curtis. It was commissioned by the BBC and aired on BBC iPlayer on 14 June 2025.

== Synopsis ==
Shifty is, according to the Guardian columnist Lucy Mangan, a "purely UK-focused dissection of recent history, built around the idea that the growing atomisation of society has ushered in an age in which the concept of a shared reality on which we can all depend has dissolved – and with it any hope of a functioning democracy." The overarching theme is that Britain is haunted by its past, constantly replayed through the media, which prevents it from going forward with a vision for the future.

Shifty depicts the changing landscape of Britain under Margaret Thatcher, including a shift of focus from politics to finance that saw the collapse of industry in the UK. Curtis argues that this shift towards individualism and consumerism has incurred a dismantling of democracy over the last 45 years.

== Episodes ==
Episodes of Shifty
| No. | Title | Duration |
|---|---|---|
| 1 | "The Land of Make Believe" | 69 minutes |
Episode one opens with the year 1979 and Britain's deindustrialisation, which had begun in the 1960s. Margaret Thatcher was elected prime minister in May 1979 promising to turn the country's fortunes around after a turbulent decade of high inflation and economic decline. Curtis suggests Thatcher increased her popularity by appealing to anti-immigration sentiment among working class voters. He argues Thatcher won by evoking the Churchillian spirit of Britain's imperial past. At the same time, many were beginning to openly question the orthodox narratives of the British Empire, and doubts were coming to the surface. Footage is shown of archaeologists unearthing a downed Hawker Hurricane and the remains of its Second World War pilot on the Isle of Sheppey, Kent. He was initially assumed to be a forgotten hero who had gone down fighting. Archive documents showed that in reality his squadron leader was woefully indecisive, making RAF pilots under his command ineffectual and easy prey for the Germans. In one clip a surviving pilot expresses disapproval at the "bogus romantic cult" around fighter pilots, saying the reality was much darker. Thatcher's attempt to end the wage-price spiral and make British industry competitive again by applying strict monetarism proved unsuccessful. "The government found that the supply of money in the economy kept growing and no one knew why", reads a caption. In a bid to control inflation, the government raised interest rates, but as a result the exchange rate rose and factories across the UK rapidly became insolvent, leading to high unemployment levels and the devastation of working class communities. The film says Thatcher's government had in fact accelerated the collapse of Britain's heavy industry. "A new atomised age of individualism" was emerging, so Thatcher would rely on myths of the past to maintain a feeling of optimism and togetherness. The episode is interspersed with clips of 1980s race riots in England, self-expression in young people's fashion and music, evolving interpersonal dynamics, and Stephen Hawking challenging old ideas about the laws of physics. The music video for The Land of Make Believe, a 1981 single by Bucks Fizz, is played at the end of the episode. According to the song's writer, Peter Sinfield, its lyrics were intended to be a criticism of Margaret Thatcher. A caption points out that Sinfield lived as a tax exile in Spain. While talking about this during a publicity interview on the podcast The Rest Is Entertainment, Curtis remarked "the underlying message of these films is never trust a liberal".
| 2 | "Suspicion" | 67 minutes |
The episode deals with paranoia arising in the United Kingdom in the early 1980s, particularly from 1982 to 1983. The episode covers, among other topics: the Argentine invasion of the Falkland Islands and Thatcher's distrust of Argentina during peace negotiations, the rise of racist skinheads and anti-immigrant violence against South Asians, police distrust of a rape victim, early adoption of CCTV cameras, and the work of Stephen Knight in popularizing conspiracies around the freemasons and British Royal family. The episode also covered major scandals like those surrounding Geoffrey Prime, as well as scandals surrounding the alleged Shoot-to-kill policy in Northern Ireland, which were influenced by Knight's conspiracies. The episode also covers the production of the popular single "Relax" by Trevor Horn, and the song's role in pioneering remixing. At the end of the episode, Adam Curtis argues that people realized that images and sounds could be remixed, and that the ability to "remix history...meant that maybe you couldn't trust the past".
| 3 | "I Love a Millionaire" | 66 minutes |
| 4 | "The Grinder" | 67 minutes |
The episode covers the negative consequences of financialization for ordinary working people from the late 1980s to the early 1990s. Among other topics, it focuses on the consequences of the 1987 Black Monday market crash, the privatization of water and how severe water pollution in Camelford was covered up in order to make privatization lucrative in 1989. It also covered the privatization of energy in 1989 and how this led companies to import cheap foreign coal, which subsequently led to mass layoffs and decline of the coal industry in 1992. In addition, the documentary covers the government's attempt to stabilize the financial system by joining the European Exchange Rate Mechanism but this resulted in investors shorting the pound and a financial crisis in 1992. The episode also focuses on cuts to funding to the London Zoo and the Zoo selling off a bonded Elephant without his mate. The episode's title is a reference to a manager at the London Zoo advising employees to only hire eager and hardworking employees who can join "the grinder" at work. Culturally, the episode follows the divorce of Stephen Hawking, the Ozzy Osborne attack on Sharon Osbourne while under the influence of drugs in 1989 and the rise of metal and other music scenes in the late 80s and early 90s. The episode also covered continued hate crimes against South Asians in the UK. Episode four concludes with the resignation of Norman Lamont who argues that the government "gives the impression of being in office but not in power" followed by a performance of "Common People" set to a montage of working class people.
| 5 | "The Democratisation of Everything" | 77 minutes |
The episode focuses on the overall fallout from the rise of individualism, particularly on the growth of finance in the 1990s. It begins with the rising view that politicians are self-interested following Conservative Party scandals, particularly the cash-for-questions affair. After the rise of New Labour, Tony Blair and Gordon Brown believed politicians were too self-interested in regulating the economy and gave the Bank of England the power to set interest rates. Curtis argues that this helped increase the power of finance, which led to a housing boom and fed ideas of the "democratisation of luxury" and "democratisation of power." However, in practice this "democratisation" led to the government giving up its power to a predatory financial system which began extracting value from ordinary people. Examples of this predation included using private data to sell subprime loans, hacking phones for tabloid news, privatized water companies increasing their profits, privatized hospitals extracting profits, and the bank of England increasing interest rates in 1998, to overcome an economic crisis, which led to factory closures in North East England. Much of the episode also follows the fashion designer Alexander McQueen who made a series of provocative fashion shows that promoted idea of democratised luxury and reflected on cultural changes in the UK. Other cultural events included the rise of multiverse theory in response to problems with Stephen Hawking's theories. Curtis argued that belief in multiple universes reflected the individualist ideology of the time, that individuals have their own private reality. Likewise, the episode follows the planning of the Millennium Dome which was meant to celebrate the new millennium but which Curtis argues "revealed a terrible truth...they [the liberal establishment] no longer had anything to say about Britain and its future." The episode argues that the only system which has been able to manage a hyper-individualized and fragmented society is the technology sector and the internet. It concludes by both saying that everyone now feels powerless and angry and asks whether people should organize to make society better. Curtis also reflects on whether the documentary itself is feeding into the tech sector as a form of control.
