= Russia 1985–1999: TraumaZone =

2022 documentary series by Adam Curtis

- Title card from episode 1
- Also known as: Russia 1985–1999: TraumaZone: What It Felt Like to Live Through The Collapse of Communism and Democracy
- Genre: Documentary
- Created by: Adam Curtis
- Country of origin: United Kingdom
- Original language: English
- No. of series: 1
- No. of episodes: 7

Production
- Executive producer: Rose Garnett
- Producer: Sandra Gorel
- Running time: 60 minutes
- Production company: BBC Film

Original release
- Network: BBC iPlayer
- Release: 13 October 2022

Russia 1985–1999: TraumaZone (subtitled in promotional media as What It Felt Like to Live Through The Collapse of Communism and Democracy) is a seven-part BBC documentary television series created by Adam Curtis. It was released on BBC iPlayer on 13 October 2022.

== Background ==
Previously unused archival footage of the Soviet Union and Russia from the BBC's Moscow bureau was unearthed and digitised by a BBC employee, Phil Goodwin. Adam Curtis appeared to be the only person within the BBC interested in using the footage. In a departure from his usual style, Curtis opted not to use voiceovers, with the only commentary made via on-screen captions. Curtis, in a piece in The Guardian, explained this choice was because the footage was "so strong that I didn’t want to intrude pointlessly, but rather let viewers simply experience what was happening". In an interview with Meduza, Curtis stated that Leo Tolstoy's War and Peace served as an inspiration for him as "it appeals to my collage mind".

== Premise ==
Using stock footage shot by the BBC, the series chronicles the collapse of the Soviet Union, the rise of capitalist Russia and its oligarchs, and the effects of this on Russian people of all levels of society, leading to the rise to power of Vladimir Putin.

== Episodes ==
Episodes of Russia 1985–1999: TraumaZone
No.	Title	Duration
1	"Part One: 1985–1989"	60 min
Perestroika aspires to save communism, but many don't believe in anything anymore. Includes footage from the AvtoVAZ factory in Tolyatti, the funeral of Kim Philby, Soviet soldiers returning from the invasion and war in Afghanistan and the April 9 tragedy anti-Soviet demonstrations in Tbilisi.
2	"Part Two: 1989–1991"	60 min
Moscow and other places suffer shortages of potatoes and other foodstuffs. Among failing attempts by the government to fix this, the first McDonald's opens in Moscow.
3	"Part Three: 1991"	60 min
Soviet hardliners attempt a coup, but fail. Russian oligarchs publish a manifest with ideas, as ideology gives way to money. Boris Yeltsin becomes the President of Russia.
4	"Part Four: 1992–1994"	60 min
Russia is thrust into a state of chaotic dreams, where nothing is stable. Some dream of restoring former imperial glory. Many cannot afford food.
5	"Part Five: 1993–1996"	60 min
Russian society is divided and millions live below the poverty line. Many live underground or in the woods. Yeltsin attacks the parliament with tanks, while arguing that it's done to save democracy.
6	"Part Six: 1994–1998"	60 min
Yeltsin believes a war in Chechnya will save him. Meanwhile, the oligarchs seize control over almost everything. Includes footage of the Battle of Grozny, the electoral campaign of Liberal Democratic Party leader Vladimir Zhirinovsky, and the trial of gangster Sergei Shashurin in Kazan.
7	"Part Seven: 1995–1999"	60 min
Western banks leave Russia. Oligarchs, after seizing power, look for a new president who would become their puppet, choosing Vladimir Putin. Russians rebel against what they call "the curse of democracy".

== Reception ==
The Guardian gave the series five stars, calling it "ingenious, essential viewing". Writing for the Financial Times, Dan Einav said "Russia 1985–1999 TraumaZone is unmistakably an Adam Curtis documentary. And an exceptional one at that."

The series won the award in the best specialist factual category at the 2023 British Academy Television Awards.
