= Ghosting Season =

Ghosting Season is an electronic music band from Manchester, UK. They also operate a small recording label, This is It Forever.

== History ==
The band was started in early 2011 by Gavin Miller and Thomas Ragsdale, and was originally a spin off from the electronic group worriedaboutsatan, and plays similar music but with rhythms more suitable for dancing. The band initially self-released two EPs: 'Far End Of The Graveyard', and the 'Far End Of The Graveyard Remixes'.

Their debut album The Very Last Of The Saints was released in 2012 by Last Night On Earth, an imprint started by DJ Sasha, to a generally positive critical response.

The singles "Far End Of The Graveyard" and "A Muffled Sound Of Voices" brought the band to a larger audience thanks to radio airplay. XFM DJ Mary Anne Hobbs later featured a guest mix from the band on her Saturday evening show

The band are particularly known for their live shows, as they use a mixture of more traditional instrumentation such as guitars and vocals, with electronic elements like laptops and Roland SPD-S drum pads.

In 2013, the band toured the UK, including a performance at the "Sounds from the Other City" concert in Salford.

In 2014, the band released a library of sound samples that it had created.
