= Waterbodies (band) =

Canadian rock band

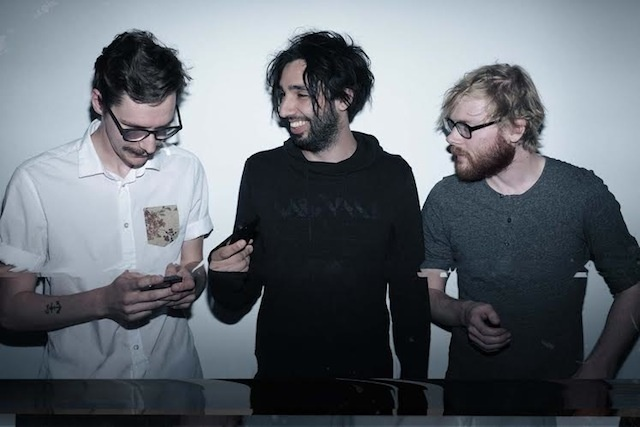

Background information
- Origin: St. Catharines, Ontario, Canada
- Genres: Garage rock
- Years active: 2008–2015
- Labels: Independent
- Members: Mike McGean; Roxy; Shane Turner
- Past members: John Neadow; Samy; Justin Jennings; Dylan Turner; Josh Korody
- Website: Official Website

Waterbodies were a Garage rock band from St. Catharines, Ontario, Canada. They performed around Ontario and released three EPs, an album and one single.

== History ==
Singer and guitarist Mike McGean and Shane Turner formed as a recording project with bass player Josh Korody in 2008. The band released an EP, Sleep Like Submarines in 2009, which was produced by Korody. Shortly after that Korody left the band; and guitarist Dylan Turner joined. They released another EP, Floresta, which, after some work by another producer, was brought back to Korody for adjustments and mastering. The band had several bass players during the next few years. After one more EP, they released a full album, The Evil We Know.

In 2012, Waterbodies performed in Toronto at the El Mocombo as part of Canada Music Week. In 2013, they released their album The Evil We Know. Soon after, Dylan Turner left the band.

In 2014, Waterbodies played at the Soil Arts Festival.

== Current members ==
- Mike McGean (Guitar, Vocals)
- Roxy (Bass, Vocals)
- Shane Turner (Drums)

== Past members ==
- John Neadow (Bass)
- Samy (Bass)
- Justin Jennings (Bass)
- Dylan Turner (Guitar, Keyboard, Vocals)
- Josh Korody (Bass)

== Discography ==
- Sleep Like Submarines, 2009
- Floresta, 2010
- Black Braille, 2011
- The Evil We Know (12"), 2013
- What the French Call 'Les Incompétents' (Single), 2014
