= Film London =

- Founded: 2003
- Type: Public Agency
- VAT ID no.: 815421552
- Purpose: Feature Film, Television, Video, Short film, Commercials and New interactive media
- Location: Suite 6.10, The Tea Building, 56 Shoreditch High Street, London, E1 6JJ
- Region served: London
- Key people: Chief Executive; Adrian Wootton
- Website: filmlondon.org.uk

Film London is an agency with the goal of promoting sustaining, promoting, and developing London major international film-making and film cultural capital.

== Establishment ==
Film London was established in 2003.

== Work ==
Film London's work includes all the screen industries based in London – film, television, video, commercials and new interactive media. Film London is one of nine regional screen agencies throughout the United Kingdom. The not-for-profit organisation is supported by the BFI and the Mayor of London.

Film London also receives significant support from Arts Council England London and ScreenSkills.

In 2018, Film London established its "Equal Access Network" to improve access to careers in film and TV for Londoners from underrepresented backgrounds. It has co-operated with other similar schemes such as the NBCUniversal's Below-the-Line Traineeship program.
