= Body of Water (musical) =

The original poster for Body of Water, the Musical.

Body of Water is an indie-rock musical created by Tony Kienitz and Tanna Herr with music by Jim Walker. It entails the life of fourteen teens left behind in a civil war crisis, awaiting further signals from their parents while hiding in a secluded mountain cabin. The show was the inaugural production of A Theatre Near U, a theatre and film academy for teenagers in the San Francisco Bay Area.

== Premise ==
A group of teenagers meet at a secluded cabin in the woods; their parents, who are now missing had instructed them to go there to hide from ideological extremists. The teens decide they will wait for the adults to arrive, but as times goes on they slowly realize that their parents may never arrive.

== Cast ==
Character	Actor
Bosh	Aaron Slipper
Willa	Cara Parker
Buster	Jackson Wylder
Charlie	Ali Arian Molaei
Henry	Ido Gal
Shorty	Shayan Hooshmand
Vienna	Bella Wilcox
Jennifer	Sara Gray
CJ	Winston Wang
Cole	Elizabeth McCole
Alice	Alia Cuadros-Contreras
Emily	Audrey Forrester
Leven	Juan Santos
April	Jasmyn Donya Molaei

== Music and cast album ==
The show was adapted from music written by Jim Walker, and the cast album of the show was digitally released on October 12, 2014. The music for the show was nominated for Best Original Music by the San Francisco Bay Area Critics Circle Excellence in Theatre Awards.

- Mummy and Daddy (Instrumental) - Band
- We Know Who You Are - Company
- Human - CJ and Jennifer
- Liberace's Grave (Ring Ring Ring) - Buster and Company
- This Is the Life - Henry, Alice, and Emily
- One of My Dreams - Jennifer
- All Fall Down - Shorty and Company
- Jobs - Company
- Rachel - Bosh
- All Up to You - Charlie and Company
- Alibis - Company
- Love Coming Through - Vienna and Company
- North Beach Tuesday - Cole and Company
- Steamline - Willa and Company
- Poor Baby - Company
- Mummy and Daddy - Bonus Track on Cast Album Performed by Jim Walker

== Awards ==
Year	Award	Category	Nominee	Result
	San Francisco Bay Area Theatre Critics Circle Awards Excellence in Theatre	Best Original Music	Jim Walker	Nominated

== Reception ==
The overall reception of Body of Water was positive. Charles Jarrett of the Rossmoor News raved of "the brilliant and cacophonic mixture of words, music, and social madness" that evolved into an "absolutely captivating, terrifying sequence of events that keep you on the edge of your seat." He also praised the music by Jim Walker as "wonderfully raw, cryptic, and thought-evoking" as well as the "exciting dance choreography" by Kaylie Caires.

Richard Conema of Talkin' Broadway agreed with Jarrett on the music and choreography. "The music by Portland and Hollywood composer Jim Walker is rich and evocative and the dances by San Diego choreographer Kaylie Caires are tornado driven, sometimes reminiscent of the work of the Alvin Ailey and Paul Taylor dance companies." He also said that the young actors of the show "are the adult performers of the future and some could very well be stars."

Harry Duke of For All Events praised the young actors as well, saying that they each created a "distinctive character and their individual work is key to accepting the totality of their situation. These young people are doing serious work and many aspire to be professional actors." He also commended producing theatre company A Theatre Near U, saying that "A Theatre Near U may have just fired the first shot in a revolution to determine the future of Youth Theatre."
