= Body of Water (2020 film) =

- Theatrical release poster
- Directed by: Lucy Brydon
- Written by: Lucy Brydon
- Produced by: Dan Cleland; Jeannette Sutton
- Starring: Sian Brooke; Amanda Burton
- Cinematography: Darran Bragg
- Edited by: Erline O'Donovan
- Music by: Rory Attwell
- Production companies: Lions Den Films; BBC Film; Boudica Films; Bright Shadow Films; British Film Institute
- Distributed by: Verve Pictures
- Release dates: 27 February 2020 (Glasgow Film Festival); 16 October 2020 (United Kingdom)
- Running time: 92 minutes
- Country: United Kingdom
- Language: English

Body of Water is a 2020 British drama film directed and written by Lucy Brydon. The film follows a woman with an eating disorder who tries to balance her relationship with her mother and her teenage daughter.

The film premiered at the Glasgow Film Festival on 27 February 2020, and was released in the United Kingdom on 16 October 2020.

== Synopsis ==
A woman with an eating disorder tries to balance her relationship with her mother and her teenage daughter.

== Cast ==
- Sian Brooke as Stephanie
- Amanda Burton as Susan

== Reception ==
On the review aggregator website Rotten Tomatoes, 93% of 14 critics' reviews are positive, with an average rating of 6.9/10.

== Release ==
The film premiered at the Glasgow Film Festival on 27 February 2020. The film was released in cinemas and on digital platforms on 16 October 2020.
