= Jess de Wahls =

German-born textile and embroidery artist

- Born: 1983 (age 42–43); Berlin, East Germany
- Known for: feminist textile & embroidery
- Style: Retex (recycled textile) sculpting
- Website: jessdewahls.com

Jess de Wahls is an East German-born textile and embroidery artist based in South London. She received media attention in 2021 when the Royal Academy announced it would be removing her work following complaints of alleged transphobia, then days later apologised and retracted. Her work focuses on what she terms 'Retex (recycled textile) sculpting', her art concerning itself with gender equality, as well as recycling.

== Background ==
de Wahls grew up in East Berlin and moved to the UK in 2004. Her work features embroidery weaving together feminism and plant life. In her art she explores subjects such as the environment, contemporary feminism, female liberation, misogyny, gender inequalities and fetishism and employs creative textile recycling as part of her practice.

She works to raise the profile of embroidery as an art form. She has said "embroidery or textile art in general has always been sidelined as women's work, and regarded as somehow less than mainstream art. I've been taking quite a stand over the years now to make a point that embroidery is just as much art as any other medium". Her work is part of a movement to depict vagina and vulva in art.

According to the Royal Academy of Arts, once in London de Wahls quickly established her name as the 'Enfant Terrible Of British Textile Arts'. The New Statesman called her a 'picture-perfect bohemian artist for our times', and the Artichoke Trust said she is 'a bona fide lynch pin of the British textile art scene'.

== Career ==
=== Artist ===
de Wahls says there are two major themes she explores throughout her work. The first is intersectional feminism, gender inequalities as well as the civil rights aspects that are often closely aligned with one another. The second is what she refers to as 'waste culture' and recycling.

de Wahls has exhibited her work in the UK, Australia and the US. She mentors finalists for the Hand & Lock Prize for Embroidery in London and also teaches her own contemporary embroidery style in national and international workshops. This has included embroidery workshops at the Soho Theatre, Laura Lea Design in London as well as in Australia where she toured with her Big Swinging Ovaries project.

In 2017 she created a feminist embroidery workshop project titled Big Swinging Ovaries. It ran out of the Tate Modern in London and also toured Australia.

She was involved in raising funds for the Vagina Museum in London. On the topic of women's genitalia, de Wahls says: "I think it is very helpful to have this conversation, making people comfortable with saying vagina, vulva, clitoris and all that kind of stuff."

Prior to 2019 she ran a small hairdressing salon out of the cabaret dressing room at the Soho Theatre.

de Wahls was commissioned by the Artichoke Trust in 2018 to create a work for PROCESSIONS' '100 years 100 Banners' together with Women for Refugee Women. Her work remains on display in the 'Women Making History' exhibition as the Trust says the banners project is "notable for its diversity and inclusivity".

== Controversy ==
de Wahls's work attracted widespread media attention in 2021 when the Royal Academy of Arts removed her work from its gift shop following complaints of alleged transphobia by eight people, before apologising and reversing the decision. The incident became the focus of a wider discussion about freedom of expression in the arts. The Academy’s secretary and chief executive, Axel Rüger, later apologised to de Wahls, and the decision to remove the work from sale was described as a failure of communication. The UK culture secretary, Oliver Dowden welcomed the apology, saying: "Freedom of expression is central to great art and culture and should always be protected."

Following the apology her work went back on sale and The Royal Academy committed to reviewing its internal processes. de Wahls reported that her sales boomed following the controversy.

== Personal life ==
de Wahls was born in East Berlin in 1983. Her mother worked as a secretary and her father in a radiator factory. After reunification both her parents took jobs as prison warders. She has a 'gender non-conforming' father who enjoys dressing in women's clothing. de Wahls has said of him: "My father doesn't do labels other than sometimes jokingly calling himself a paradise bird."
