= Adam Curtis =

British documentary filmmaker (born 1955)

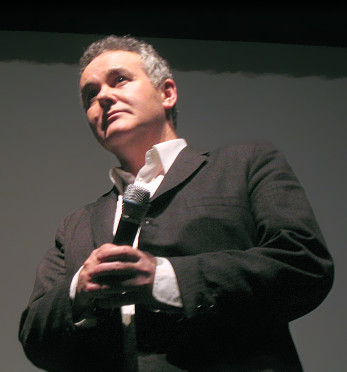
- Curtis in 2005
- Born: Kevin Adam Curtis; 26 May 1955 (age 71); Dartford, Kent, England
- Education: Mansfield College, Oxford (BA)
- Occupation: Documentary filmmaker
- Years active: 1983–present
- Awards: BAFTA (1993, 2000, 2006, 2023)

Kevin Adam Curtis (born 26 May 1955) is an English documentary filmmaker. Curtis began his career as a conventional documentary producer for the BBC throughout the 1980s and into the early 1990s. The release of Pandora's Box (1992) marked the introduction of Curtis's distinctive presentation that uses collage to explore aspects of sociology, psychology, philosophy, and political history.

His style has been described as involving, "whiplash digressions, menacing atmospherics and arpeggiated scores, and the near-psychedelic compilation of archival footage", narrated by Curtis himself with "patrician economy and assertion". His films have won five BAFTAs.

== Early life ==
Adam Curtis was born in Dartford in Kent, and raised in nearby Platt. His father was Martin Curtis (1917–2002), a cinematographer with a socialist background. Curtis won a county scholarship and attended the Sevenoaks School. It was there that an influential art teacher introduced him to the work of Robert Rauschenberg. Curtis completed a Bachelor of Arts degree in human sciences at Mansfield College, Oxford. He began a PhD and taught in politics, but ultimately became disillusioned with academia and decided to leave.

== Career ==
=== Early career ===
Curtis applied to the BBC and was hired to make a film for one of its training courses, comparing designer clothes in music videos to the design of weapons. He was subsequently given a post on That's Life!, a magazine series that juxtaposed hard-hitting investigations and light-hearted content. He was a film director on Out of Court, a BBC Two legal series, from 1980 until 1982.

=== Politics ===
Curtis is inspired by the sociologist Max Weber, who, he argues, challenged the "crude, left-wing, vulgar Marxism that says that everything happens because of economic forces within society". Curtis has answered questions on his politics in interviews over his career but has answered inconsistently, making it hard to label his politics. In a 2012 interview, Curtis remarked on his political outlook stating fondness for libertarian ideas but states his politics are unique and differ depending on the issue. Curtis also rejects being labelled a leftist, calling the idea "rubbish", saying:

People often accuse me of being a lefty. That's complete rubbish. If you look at The Century of the Self, what I'm arguing is something very close to a neoconservative position because I'm saying that, with the rise of individualism, you tend to get the corrosion of the other idea of social bonds and communal networks, because everyone is on their own. Well, that's what the neoconservatives argue, domestically. ... If you ask me what my politics are, I'm very much a creature of my time. I don't really have any. I change my mind over different issues, but I am much more fond of a libertarian view. I have a more libertarian tendency ... What's astonishing in our time is how the Left here has completely failed to come up with any alternatives, and I think you may well see a lefty libertarianism emerging because people will be much more sympathetic to it, or just a libertarianism, and out of that will come ideas. And I don't mean "localism".

In a 2021 interview, Curtis stated having sympathies to radicalism and that progressivism is his politics. He notes again his political inconsistency, saying:

I'm emotionally sympathetic to radicalism ... I'm a progressive, I mean that's really what my politics are. I mean, I'm typical of my time, I don't have a consistent set of politics and I always suspect people who do, but I'm progressive so I try and understand what went wrong with radicalism.

In a 2022 interview, Curtis reiterated the neoconservative interpretation of "The Century of the Self" but added it is not what he himself believes. This time, Curtis states that he does not know his exact politics, saying:

[The Century of the Self could be interpreted as] a crystal perfect piece of neoconservative ideology, domestic neoconservatism, because what it's actually arguing is the rise of individualism acted like an acid eating away at the fabric of social organisations... which is a sort of moralistic neocon attitude. That's not actually what I think. But you could argue that about most films, I think. I don't know really what my politics are.

=== Documentaries ===
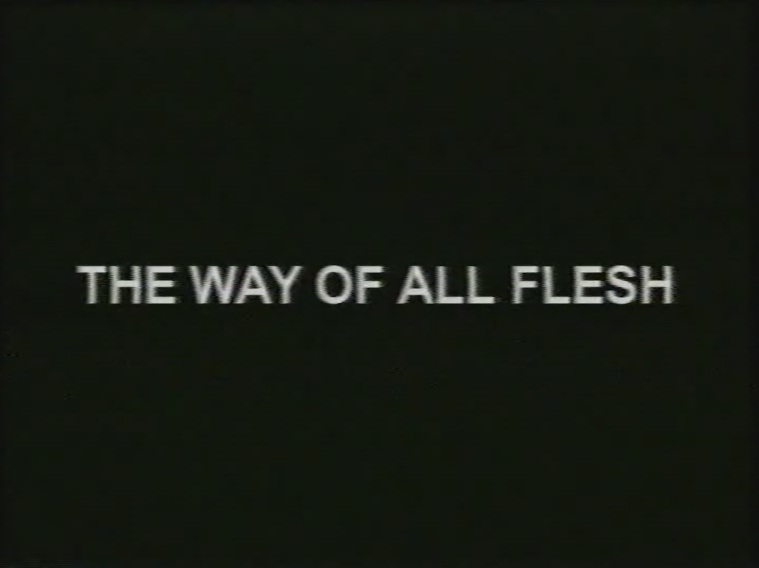
Example of Curtis's "trademark" title screens (Modern Times: The Way of All Flesh, 1997)

According to a profile of Curtis by Tim Adams, published in The Observer: "If there has been a theme in Curtis's work ... it has been to look at how different elites have tried to impose an ideology on their times, and the tragicomic consequences of those attempts". Curtis cites the U.S.A. trilogy, a series of three novels by John Dos Passos that he first read when he was thirteen, as the greatest influence on his work:

You can trace back everything I do to that novel because it's all about grand history, individual experience, their relationship. And also collages, quotes from newsreels, cinema, newspapers. And it's about collage of history as well. That's where I get it all from.

He has also cited Robert Rauschenberg and Émile Zola as creative influences. Curtis makes extensive use of archive footage in his documentaries. He has acknowledged the influence of recordings made by Erik Durschmied and is "constantly using his stuff in my films". Discussing his process in an interview with fellow documentary-maker Jon Ronson for Vice, Curtis said his extensive work with footage acquired from the BBC Archives is often led by "instinct and imagination", with the aim of creating "a mood that gives power and force to the story I'm telling".

Instead of specially composed music, which Curtis has said "creates a sort of monoculture", he uses tracks from a variety of genres, decades, and countries, as well as sound effects that he discovers on old tapes. Music in Curtis' documentaries often contrasts with images to disorient the audience or to create irony and humour. Discussing The Power of Nightmares, Curtis explained: "Humour undercuts the mix of fact and fiction used by the politics of fear-mongering. And if you're trying to illustrate complex arguments, images and music can help".

In 2005, Curtis received the Golden Gate Persistence of Vision Award at the San Francisco International Film Festival. In 2006, he was given the Alan Clarke Award for Outstanding Creative Contribution to Television at the British Academy Television Awards. In 2009, the Sheffield International Documentary Festival gave Curtis the Inspiration Award for inspiring viewers and other documentary filmmakers. In 2015, he was awarded the True Vision Award by the True/False Film Fest. Curtis's critics have accused him of exaggeration and distortion, even wilful misrepresentation.

=== Blog ===
Curtis administered a blog subtitled 'The Medium and the Message' hosted by the BBC and updated between 2009 and 2016.

== Filmography ==
Year	Title	Subject	Parts	Channel/Venue	Notes & Awards
1983	Just Another Day: "Selfridges"	Behind the scenes at Selfridges, a department store on Oxford Street, London.	S01E03	BBC Two, 29 March 1983	
1983	Just Another Day: "The Seaside"	A typical day in Walton-on-the-Naze.	S01E06	BBC Two, 19 April 1983	
1983	Trumpets and Typewriters: A History of War Reporting	The history of war correspondents.	Film	BBC One, 19 July 1983	
1984	Inquiry: The Great British Housing Disaster.	The system-built housing of the 1960s. Narrated by David Jones.	Film	BBC Two, 4 September 1984	
1984	Italians: "The Mayor of Montemilone"	The politics of a small Italian town and its communist mayor, Dino Labriola.	S01E04	BBC One, 26 October 1984	
1984	The Cost of Treachery	The Albanian Subversion, in which the CIA and MI6 attempted to overthrow the Albanian government and to weaken the Soviet Union at the height of the Cold War in 1949, and the role of double agent Kim Philby.	Film	BBC One, 30 October 1984	
1987	40 Minutes: "Bombay Hotel"	The luxurious Taj Mahal Palace Hotel in Mumbai, contrasted with the poverty of the city's slums.	Film	BBC Two, 30 April 1987	
1988	An Ocean Apart	Explores the relationship between the United Kingdom and the United States from World War I to the 1980s.	7	BBC One, 20 April 1988	
1989	40 Minutes: "The Kingdom of Fun"	Documentary about the Metro Centre in Gateshead, developed by entrepreneur John Hall. It compares Hall's plans to regenerate North East England with those of Labour politician T. Dan Smith.	Film	BBC Two, 19 January 1989	
1989	Inside Story: "The Road to Terror"	How the Iranian Revolution turned from idealism to terror, drawing parallels with the French Revolution two hundred years earlier.	E06	BBC One, 14 June 1989	
1992	Pandora's Box	The dangers of technocratic and political rationality.	6	BBC Two, 11 June 1992	Originality and Best Factual Series, BAFTA Awards 1993
1995	The Living Dead	The different ways that history and memory (both national and individual) have been used and manipulated by politicians and others.	3	BBC Two, 30 May 1995	
1996	£830,000,000 – Nick Leeson and the Fall of the House of Barings	Nick Leeson and the collapse of Barings Bank.	Film	BBC One, 12 June 1996	An Inside Story special. Later titled 25 Million Pounds.
1997	Modern Times: "The Way of All Flesh"	The story, dating back to the 1950s, of the search for a cure to cancer, and the impact of Henrietta Lacks, the "woman who will never die" because her cells never stopped reproducing.	Film	BBC Two, 19 March 1997	
1999	The Mayfair Set	Looks at the birth of the global arms trade, the invention of asset stripping, and how buccaneer capitalists shaped the Thatcher years, focusing on the rise of Colonel David Stirling, Jim Slater, Sir James Goldsmith and Tiny Rowland—members of the elite Clermont Club in the 1960s.	4	BBC Two, 18 July 1999	Best Factual Series or Strand, BAFTA Awards 2000
2002	The Century of the Self	How Freud's theories on the unconscious led to the development of public relations by his nephew Edward Bernays; the use of desire over need; and self-actualisation as a means of achieving economic growth and the political control of populations.	4	BBC Two, 17 March 2002; art-house cinemas in the U.S.	Best Documentary Series, Broadcast Awards; Historical Film of the Year, Longman-History Today Awards; Nominated for Best Documentary Series, Royal Television Society
2004	The Power of Nightmares	Suggests a parallel between the rise of Islamism in the Arab world and neoconservatism in the United States, and their mutual need, argues Curtis, to create the myth of a dangerous enemy to gain support.	3	BBC Two, 20 October 2004	Best Factual Series or Strand, BAFTA Awards 2005
2007	The Trap	Explores the modern concept of freedom, specifically, "how a simplistic model of human beings as self-seeking, almost robotic creatures led to today's idea of freedom".	3	BBC Two, 7 March 2007	
2007	The Rise and Fall of the TV Journalist	Short film chronicling the transformation of mainstream media and the balance of political power in the last few decades by looking at how the role of the broadcast journalist has changed since the 1950s.	Short film	Charlie Brooker's Screenwipe, S4E03	
2009	Oh Dearism	Short film about how mainstream media simplify complex events and present them as "scattered terrible things happening everywhere, Oh Dear", leaving the public feeling powerless to do anything about them.	Short film	Charlie Brooker's Newswipe, S1E03	
2009	It Felt Like a Kiss	Collaboration with theatre company Punchdrunk and Damon Albarn.	Film	Manchester International Festival	
2010	Paranoia and Moral Panics	Short film using the paranoia of Richard Nixon to explore how a similar outlook on life has been propagated on a larger social scale in the new media age and the resulting moral panics and immobilisation of politics.	Short film	Charlie Brooker's Newswipe, S2E04	
2011	All Watched Over by Machines of Loving Grace	Argues that computers have failed to liberate humanity, and instead have "distorted and simplified our view of the world around us". The title is taken from a 1967 poem of the same name by Richard Brautigan.	3	BBC Two, 23 May 2011	
2011	Every Day Is Like Sunday	The rise and fall of press baron Cecil King, and the changing relationship between the public, politics and the media.	Film	His personal blog; not a full documentary, but "a rough cut".	
2013	Everything Is Going According to Plan (Massive Attack v Adam Curtis)	Collaboration with Massive Attack. Based on technocrats and global corporations establishing an ultraconservative norm, with the internet providing a "fake, enchanting world, which has become a kind of prison".	Short film	Manchester International Festival	
2014	Oh Dearism II	Short film examining the global events of 2014 to reveal a chaotic morass, the reporting of which is increasingly difficult to comprehend in the context of the 24-hour news cycle and the internet (special feature on Russian Vladislav Surkov).	Short film	Charlie Brooker's 2014 Wipe, 30 December 2014	
2015	Bitter Lake	How Western leaders' simplistic good vs. evil narrative has failed in the complex post-war era, and how many Islamic terrorist groups have their origins in the U.S.'s long-standing alliance with Saudi Arabia.	Film	BBC iPlayer, 25 January 2015	
2016	Living in an Unreal World	Short film for Vice Media about the illusion of stability, freedom, and prosperity in the West, comparing it to life in the Soviet Union during the 1970s. Ends with a trailer for HyperNormalisation.	Short film	VICE (Facebook), 15 October 2016	
2016	HyperNormalisation	"How we got to this strange time of great uncertainty and confusion where those who are supposed to be in power are paralysed and have no idea what to do".	Film	BBC iPlayer, 16 October 2016	Nominated for Best Single Documentary, BAFTA Awards 2017
2017	MK Ultra	Dance collaboration with Rosie Kay Dance Company. Explores project MKUltra and conspiracy theories including the Illuminati, themes later reworked into Can't Get You Out of My Head.	Dance	Live performance. Commissioned by Birmingham Repertory Theatre, DanceXchange, Warwick Arts Centre & HOME	
2019	Untitled	Collaboration with Massive Attack. "How we have moved into a strange backward-looking world, enclosed by machines that read our data and predict our every move, haunted by ghosts from the past".		Mezzanine XXI tour	
2021	Can't Get You Out of My Head	A six-part BBC documentary series that "tells the story of how we got to the strange days we are now experiencing. And why both those in power – and we – find it so difficult to move on". It "explores whether modern culture, despite its radicalism, is really just part of the new system of power".	6	BBC iPlayer, 11 February 2021	
2022	Russia 1985–1999: TraumaZone	Seven hour-long films about the disintegration of the Soviet Union and subsequent rise to power of Vladimir Putin as the President of Russia, seen through the eyes of Russian people at every level of society.	7	Premiered at Telluride Film Festival, 2022 BBC iPlayer, 13 October 2022	Best Specialist Factual, BAFTA Awards 2023
2024	The Way	3 part drama series co-created by Curtis.	3	BBC One	
2025	Shifty	"Shifty shows, in a new and imaginative way, how over the past 40 years in Britain extreme money and hyper-individualism came together in an unspoken alliance"	5	BBC iPlayer, 14 June 2025	

=== Music videos ===
Year	Title	Subject
2023	God Turn Me into a Flower	A music video comprising edited concert footage of Weyes Blood.
