= Rose Garnett =

British film producer

Rose Garnett (born 1970) is a British film producer and was previously the director of BBC Film, the feature film-making arm of the BBC, from 2020 to 2022, whereupon she joined A24 to oversee its international film and TV slate. Garnett has a producing credit on 26 productions.

== Biography ==
Garnett was born in 1970 to Andy Garnett and Polly Devlin, a writer for Vogue from County Tyrone.

After graduating from the University of Cambridge, Garnett's first job in 1993 was as the producer of Talking Tongues Theatre Company with David Farr, Rachel Weisz and Sasha Hails. She and Farr then took over the Gate Theatre in Notting Hill where they commissioned and worked with many writers and directors including Lee Hall, Tracy Letts, Dominic Cook and Sarah Kane. Garnett has worked as a script editor and producer, with her credits including Darren Aronofsky's Black Swan (Associate Producer) and Katrina Boorman's Me And Me Dad (Executive Producer).

Garnett joined the BBC in 2017 from Film4 where she was Head of Creative. Whilst there, Rose developed and executive produced an array of recent successful UK films including Lenny Abrahamson's Room, Andrea Arnold's American Honey and Martin McDonagh's Three Billboards. Rose began her time at Film4 as Head of Development in 2014 before being promoted to Head of Editorial in 2014 and finally Head of Creative in 2015.
