= Jeyes =

Jeyes may refer to:

== People ==
- James Jeyes (1890–?), English footballer
- John Jeyes (1817–1892), English chemist

== Other uses ==
- Jeyes Fluid, brand of disinfectant fluid
- Jeyes Tournament, Irish golf tournament sponsored by Jeyes Group
