= List of S-phrases =

S-phrases were defined in Annex IV:Safety advice concerning dangerous substances and preparations of the European Union Directive 67/548/EEC - Dangerous Substances Directive. The list was amended and republished in Directive 2001/59/EC. (Note: Commission Directive 2001/59/EC of 6 August 2001 adapting to technical progress for the 28th time Council Directive 67/548/EEC on the approximation of the laws, regulations and administrative provisions relating to the classification, packaging and labelling of dangerous substances. No longer in force, Date of end of validity: 31/05/2015; Implicitly repealed by 32008R1272.) The list was subsequently updated and republished in Directive 2006/102/EC. (Note: Council Directive 2006/102/EC of 20 November 2006 adapting Directive 67/548/EEC on the classification, packaging and labelling of dangerous substances, by reason of the accession of Bulgaria and Romania: Annex IV - Safety advice concerning dangerous substances and preparations. No longer in force, Date of end of validity: 31/05/2015; Implicitly repealed by 32008R1272.) The entirety of Directive 67/548/EEC, including these S-phrases, were superseded completely on 1 June 2015 by Regulation (EC) No 1272/2008 - Classification, Labelling and Packaging Regulations.

These safety phrases were used internationally and not just in Europe, and there is an ongoing effort towards complete international harmonization. This harmonization would be carried out by the United Nations's Globally Harmonized System of Classification and Labelling of Chemicals, that replaced Directive 67/548/EEC under CLP Regulation. S-Phrases successor in GHS were GHS precautionary statements, which encompasses both S-phrases and R-phrases.

== Safety phrases ==
Code	Phrase
S1	Keep locked up.
S2	Keep out of the reach of children.
S3	Keep in a cool place.
S4	Keep away from living quarters.
S5	Keep contents under ... (appropriate liquid to be specified by the manufacturer).
S6	Keep under ... (inert gas to be specified by the manufacturer).
S7	Keep container tightly closed.
S8	Keep container dry.
S9	Keep container in a well-ventilated place.
S10	Keep contents wet. (No longer used, removed from regulations)
S11	Avoid contact with air. (No longer used, removed from regulations)
S12	Do not keep the container sealed
S13	Keep away from food, drink and animal feedingstuffs.
S14	Keep away from ... (incompatible materials to be indicated by the manufacturer)
S15	Keep away from heat.
S16	Keep away from sources of ignition - No smoking.
S17	Keep away from combustible material.
S18	Handle and open container with care.
S20	When using do not eat or drink.
S21	When using do not smoke.
S22	Do not breathe dust.
S23	Do not breathe gas/fumes/vapour/spray (appropriate wording to be specified by the manufacturer).
S24	Avoid contact with skin.
S25	Avoid contact with eyes.
S26	In case of contact with eyes, rinse immediately with plenty of water and seek medical advice.
S27	Take off immediately all contaminated clothing.
S28	After contact with skin, wash immediately with plenty of ... (to be specified by the manufacturer).
S29	Do not empty into drains.
S30	Never add water to this product.
S33	Take precautionary measures against static discharges. (No longer used, removed from regulations)
S34	Avoid strokes and frictions. (No longer used, removed from regulations)
S35	This material and its container must be disposed of in a safe way.
S36	Wear suitable protective clothing.
S37	Wear suitable gloves.
S38	In case of insufficient ventilation wear suitable respiratory equipment.
S39	Wear eye/face protection.
S40	To clean the floor and all objects contaminated by this material use ... (to be specified by the manufacturer).
S41	In case of fire and/or explosion do not breathe fumes.
S42	During fumigation/spraying wear suitable respiratory equipment (appropriate wording to be specified by the manufacturer).
S43	In case of fire use ... (indicate in the space the precise type of fire-fighting equipment. If water increases the risk add - Never use water).
S44	If you feel unwell, seek medical advice immediately. (Show the label where possible.) (No longer used, removed from regulations)
S45	In case of accident or if you feel unwell seek medical advice immediately (show the label where possible).
S46	If swallowed, seek medical advice immediately and show this container or label.
S47	Keep at temperature not exceeding ... °C (to be specified by the manufacturer).
S48	Keep wet with ... (appropriate material to be specified by the manufacturer).
S49	Keep only in the original container.
S50	Do not mix with ... (to be specified by the manufacturer).
S51	Use only in well-ventilated areas.
S52	Not recommended for interior use on large surface areas.
S53	Avoid exposure - obtain special instructions before use.
S54	Before draining of to sewage disposal plant ask permission of the competent authority. (No longer used, removed from regulations)
S55	Before draining of into sewage system or into waters treat according to state of art. (No longer used, removed from regulations)
S56	Dispose of this material and its container at hazardous or special waste collection point.
S57	Use appropriate containment to avoid environmental contamination.
S58	Dispose as hazardous waste. (No longer used, removed from regulations)
S59	Refer to manufacturer/supplier for information on recovery/recycling.
S60	This material and its container must be disposed of as hazardous waste.
S61	Avoid release to the environment. Refer to special instructions/safety data sheet.
S62	If swallowed, do not induce vomiting: seek medical advice immediately and show this container or label where possible.
S63	In case of accident by inhalation: remove casualty to fresh air and keep at rest.
S64	If swallowed, rinse mouth with water (only if the person is conscious).
Combinations of S phrases.
S1/2	Keep locked up and out of the reach of children.
S3/7	Keep container tightly closed in a cool place.
S3/7/9	Keep container tightly closed in a cool, well-ventilated place. (No longer used, removed from regulations)
S3/9/14	Keep in a cool, well-ventilated place away from ... (incompatible materials to be indicated by the manufacturer).
S3/9/14/49	Keep only in the original container in a cool, well-ventilated place away from ... (incompatible materials to be indicated by the manufacturer).
S3/9/49	Keep only in the original container in a cool, well-ventilated place.
S3/14	Keep in a cool place away from ... (incompatible materials to be indicated by the manufacturer).
S7/8	Keep container tightly closed and dry.
S7/9	Keep container tightly closed and in a well-ventilated place.
S7/47	Keep container tightly closed and at temperature not exceeding ... °C (to be specified by the manufacturer).
S20/21	When using do not eat, drink or smoke.
S24/25	Avoid contact with skin and eyes.
S27/28	After contact with skin, take off immediately all contaminated clothing, and wash immediately with plenty of ... (to be specified by the manufacturer).
S29/35	Do not empty into drains; dispose of this material and its container in a safe way.
S29/56	Do not empty into drains, dispose of this material and its container at hazardous or special waste collection point.
S36/37	Wear suitable protective clothing and gloves.
S36/37/39	Wear suitable protective clothing, gloves and eye/face protection.
S36/39	Wear suitable protective clothing and eye/face protection.
S37/39	Wear suitable gloves and eye/face protection.
S47/49	Keep only in the original container at temperature not exceeding ... °C (to be specified by the manufacturer).

== See also ==
- List of R-phrases
- Risk and Safety Statements
- GHS precautionary statements - Successor to S-phrases.
- Material safety data sheet
