= Directive 67/548/EEC =

- European Union directive
- Text with EEA relevance
- Title: Directive on the approximation of laws, regulations and administrative provisions relating to the classification, packaging and labelling of dangerous substances
- Made by: Council
- Made under: Art. 100 (EEC)
- Journal reference: L196, 16 August 1967, pp. 1–98
- EEA Agreement: Chap. XV of Annex II

History
- Date made: 27 June 1967
- Entry into force: 29 June 1967
- Implementation date: 1 January 1970

Preparative texts
- EP opinion: OJ 209, 11 December 1965, pp. 3133–40

Other legislation
- Amended by: External list
- Replaced by: Reg. (EC) No 1272/2008 (from 1 June 2015)

The Dangerous Substances Directive (as amended) was one of the main European Union laws concerning chemical safety, until its full replacement by the new regulation CLP Regulation (2008), starting in 2016. It was made under Article 100 (Art. 94 in a consolidated version) of the Treaty of Rome. By agreement, it is also applicable in the EEA, and compliance with the directive will ensure compliance with the relevant Swiss laws. The Directive ceased to be in force on 31 May 2015 and was repealed by Regulation (EC) No 1272/2008 of the European Parliament and of the Council of 16 December 2008 on classification, labelling and packaging of substances and mixtures, amending and repealing Directives 67/548/EEC and 1999/45/EC, and amending Regulation (EC) No 1907/2006 (Text with EEA relevance).

== Scope ==
The directive applies to pure chemicals and to mixtures of chemicals (preparations) that are placed on the market in the European Union, therefore it does not apply directly to substances created purely for research purposes. Additional rules concerning preparations are contained in the Dangerous Preparations Directive (1999/45/EC): these are very similar to the rules contained in the Dangerous Substances Directive 67/548/EEC. The directive does not apply to the following groups of substances and preparations (Art. 1):

- Cosmetics, which are covered by the Cosmetics Directive
- Food for humans or animals
- Medicines
- Pesticides
- Radioactive materials
- Waste

The directive does not apply to the transport of dangerous substances or preparations.

== Classification of dangerous substances ==
Article 2 of the directive lists the classes of substances or preparations that are considered to be dangerous. Some, but not all, of these classes are associated with a chemical hazard symbol and/or a code.

- Explosives (E)
- Oxidizing agents (O)
- Flammable substances or preparations, classified as extremely flammable (F+), highly flammable (F)
- Toxic substances or preparations, classified as very toxic (T+) or toxic (T)
- Corrosive substances or preparations (C)
- Harmful substances or preparations (Xn)
- Irritants (Xi)
- Sensitizers (R42 and/or R43)
- Carcinogens (Carc.), classified into three categories
- Mutagens (Mut.), classified into three categories
- Substances or preparations that are toxic for reproduction (Repr.), classified into three categories
- Substances or preparations that are dangerous for the environment (N)

Substances or preparations falling into one or more of these classes are listed in Annex I of the directive, which is regularly updated. A public database of substances listed in Annex I is maintained by the Institute for Health and Consumer Protection.

== Danger symbols ==
The danger symbols are defined in Annex II of the directive. A consolidated list with translations into other EU languages can be found in Directive 2001/59/EC.

Explosive (E)

Highly Flammable (F) and Extremely Flammable (F+)

Oxidizing(O)

Toxic (T) and Very Toxic (T+)

Harmful (Xn) and Irritant (Xi)

Corrosive (C)

Dangerous for the Environment (N)

== Standard Risk and Safety phrases ==
The standard phrases are defined in Annexes III and IV of the directive. Annex III defines phrases relating to the Nature of special risks attributed to dangerous substances and preparations, often referred to as R-phrases. Annex IV defines phrases relating to Safety advice concerning dangerous substances and preparations, often referred to as S-phrases.

The appropriate standard phrases must appear on the packaging and label of the product and on its MSDS. Annex I specifies the standard phrases to be used for substances that are listed there: these are obligatory.

The lists of standard phrases were updated in 2001, and Directive 2001/59/EC provides a consolidated list in all EU languages.

The last update is European Regulation (EC) N°1272/2008, establishing the new CLP Regulation that implement the GHS system). See the current European chemical hazard symbols (CLP/GHS_hazard_statements).

== Packaging requirements ==
(Article 22)

== Labelling requirements ==
(Articles 23–25) In general, the label on the packaging of a dangerous substance or preparation must clearly indicate the following items:

- The name of the substance; (for substances listed in Annex I, the name indicated must be one of those listed in the Annex (many substances appear in the Annex under different synonyms): otherwise, the name should be "internationally recognized")
- The name, full address and telephone number of the person or company which has placed the substance on the market (manufacturer, importer or distributor);
- The danger symbols, if any;
- The standard phrases, if any; (certain exemptions are permitted)
- The EINECS number or equivalent;
- For substances listed in Annex I, the words EEC label.

== Material safety data sheet ==
Article 27 of the directive imposes an obligation on suppliers to provide a material safety data sheet, on paper or electronically, at or before the first delivery of a dangerous substance or preparation. The supplier is also obliged to inform users of any relevant new information which becomes known. Directive 2001/58/EC provides detailed guidance for the preparation of material safety data sheets.

== See also ==
- Dangerous goods
- EU-Eco-regulation
- Registration, Evaluation and Authorisation of Chemicals
- Risk and Safety Statements
- Toxic Substances Control Act (TSCA, US regulations)
