= European hazard symbols =

Pictograms for labelling chemicals in the European Union

European hazard symbols for chemicals are pictograms defined by the European Union for labelling chemical packaging (for storage and workplace) and containers (for transportation). They are standardised currently by the CLP/GHS classification.

== GHS hazard pictograms ==
- The European Union CLP Regulation (for "Classification, Labelling and Packaging") was introduced as EC Regulation 1272/2008. It is based on the GHS system, to secure for "physical, health and environment hazards".

ADR European hazard sign, meaning highly flammable (33) — gasoline (1203)

- The European Agreement concerning the International Carriage of Dangerous Goods by Road (ADR) fixed harmonised pictograms for transportation. Vehicles carrying dangerous goods have to be fitted with orange signs, where the lower number identifies the substance, while the upper number is a key for the threat it may pose.

== Chemical warning signage ==
Directive 92/58/EEC provides several safety signs for identifying dangerous materials and areas where they are handled and stored.

Directive 92/58/EEC Warning Signage

Flammable material

Explosive material

Toxic material

Corrosive material

Oxidant material

Harmful or irritant material
(Withdrawn 2014)

== Former hazard pictograms (1967–2017) ==
The previous hazard symbols for chemicals, were introduced in the Directive Directive 67/548/EEC, in 1967, and required to be adopted no later than 1 January 1970. The symbols were also included as a part of Directive 1999/45/EC. The symbols were replaced from 1 December 2010 to 1 June 2017, via a gradual phaseout. After 1 June 2017, Directive 67/548/EEC symbols were no longer allowed to be used.

From 1967 to 2017, these symbols were used for labeling containers and piping systems containing dangerous substances/mixtures. These symbols could also be used to identify areas where dangerous substances/mixtures were being stored in large quantities, as an alternative to the yellow triangular Directive 92/58/EEC warning signage.

Europe standard hazard pictograms for labelling – Directives 67/548/EEC, 1999/45/EC
Hazard pictogram & mention, code	Substances examples
Explosive (E)	TNT, acetone peroxide, nitroglycerin, picric acid
Extremely Flammable (F+)	Hydrogen, acetylene, propane, butane, diethyl ether, carbon disulfide, acetaldehyde
Highly Flammable (F)	Ethanol, acetone, gasoline, hexamine, methanol
Oxidizing (O)	Oxygen, potassium nitrate, hydrogen peroxide, nitric acid, potassium permanganate
Toxic (T)	Sulfuric acid, TNT, Nitroglycerin, carbon disulfide, methanol, ammonia, formaldehyde
Very toxic (T+)	Prussic acid, nicotine, carbon monoxide, white phosphorus
Harmful (Xn) (Note: The 'n' in Harmful (Xn) stands for the French word nocif (harmful) and the Italian word nocivo (noxious).)	Hexamine, butane, naphtha, acetaldehyde
Irritant (Xi)	Sodium hypochlorite, acetone, ethanol
Corrosive (C)	Sulfuric acid, Nitric acid, sodium hydroxide, ammonia, White phosphorus
Dangerous for the environment (N)	Sulfuric acid, turpentine, lead, mercury, Crude oil
