= Hazard symbol =

Warning symbol on locations or products

Skull and crossbones, a common symbol for poison and other sources of lethal danger (GHS hazard pictograms)

Hazard symbols are universally recognized symbols designed to alert individuals to the presence of hazardous or dangerous materials, locations, or conditions. These include risks associated with electromagnetic fields, electric currents, toxic chemicals, explosive substances, and radioactive materials. Their design and use are often governed by laws and standards organizations to ensure clarity and consistency. Hazard symbols may vary in color, background, borders, or accompanying text to indicate specific dangers and levels of risk, such as toxicity classes. These symbols provide a quick, universally understandable visual warning that transcends language barriers, making them more effective than text-based warnings in many situations.

== List of standardized hazard symbol systems ==
Standard	Warning	Scope	Audience	State
ISO 7010 warning symbols	Warning	General purpose warning symbols	The general public	Currently used
GHS hazard pictograms	Warning	The labelling of containers and for workplace hazard warnings, and for use during the transport of dangerous goods	The general public, the workplace, and material transport personnel	Currently used
EU Directive 67/548/EEC	Warning	The labelling of containers in the EU, used until 2017	Mixtures of chemicals that are placed on the market in the European Union	No longer used
WHMIS 1988	Warning	Workplace hazard warnings used in Canada, mostly replaced by GHS as of 2018	Workplace Hazards in Canada	No longer used, except biological hazard symbol

== Examples of common symbols ==
Warning	ISO 7010	ANSI Z535 (United States) (Note: United States legislation and standards typically do not prescribe exact symbol designs. Designs can vary from those shown.)
General warning sign	ISO 7010 W001	—N/a
Flammable material	ISO 7010 W021	USA flammable
Explosive materials	ISO 7010 W002	USA explosion hazard
Toxic material	ISO 7010 W016	Poison
Corrosive substance	ISO 7010 W023	USA corrosive material
Electricity hazard	ISO 7010 W012	USA electric shock
Radioactive material or ionizing radiation	ISO 7010 W003	USA radiation hazard
Biological hazard	ISO 7010 W009	US ANSI Biohazard Symbol
Floor-level obstacle	ISO 7010 W007	
Drop or fall hazard	ISO 7010 W008	
Slippery surface	ISO 7010 W011	

Tape with yellow and black diagonal stripes is commonly used as a generic hazard warning. This can be in the form of barricade tape, or as a self-adhesive tape for marking floor areas and the like. In some regions (for instance the UK) yellow tape is buried a certain distance above buried electrical cables to warn future groundworkers of the hazard.

== Generic warning symbol ==
Generic warning symbol (Background color varies)

On roadside warning signs, an exclamation mark is often used to draw attention to a generic warning of danger, hazards, and the unexpected. In Europe and elsewhere in the world (except North America and Australia), this type of sign is used if there are no more-specific signs to denote a particular hazard. When used for traffic signs, it is accompanied by a supplementary sign describing the hazard, usually mounted under the exclamation mark.

This symbol has also been more widely adopted for generic use in many other contexts not associated with road traffic. It often appears on hazardous equipment, in instruction manuals to draw attention to a precaution, on tram/train blind spot warning stickers and on natural disaster (earthquake, tsunami, hurricane, volcanic eruption) preparedness posters/brochures—as an alternative when a more-specific warning symbol is not available.

== Poison symbol ==
☠o

Hazard symbol
- In Unicode: U+2620 ☠ SKULL AND CROSSBONES

The "skull-and-crossbones" symbol, consisting of a human skull and two bones crossed together behind the skull, is today generally used as a warning of danger of death, particularly in regard to poisonous substances.

The symbol, or some variation thereof, specifically with the bones (or swords) below the skull, was also featured on the Jolly Roger, the traditional flag of European and American seagoing pirates. It is also part of the Canadian WHMIS home symbols placed on containers to warn that the contents are poisonous.

In the United States, due to concerns that the skull-and-crossbones symbol's association with pirates might encourage children to play with toxic materials, the Mr. Yuk symbol is also used to denote poison.

This symbol has also been more widely adopted for generic use in many other contexts not associated with poisonous materials. It used for denoting number of dead victims caused by natural disasters (e.g. earthquakes) or armed conflicts on event infographics.

== Ionizing radiation symbol ==
☢o

Radioactive sign
- In Unicode: U+2622 ☢ RADIOACTIVE SIGN

The international radiation symbol is a trefoil around a small central circle representing radiation from an atom. It was designed by mechanical engineer Cyrill Orly in 1946 at the University of California, Berkeley Radiation Laboratory. When the first radiation hazard signs were created, they were rendered as magenta, and was set on a blue background. The shade of magenta used (Martin Senour Roman Violet No. 2225) was chosen because it was expensive and less likely to be used on other signs. However, a blue background for other signs started to be used extensively. Blue was typically used on information signs and the color tended to fade with weathering. This resulted in the background being changed on the radiation hazard sign. The original version used in the United States is magenta against a yellow background, and it is drawn with a central circle of radius R, an internal radius of 1.5R and an external radius of 5R for the blades, which are separated from each other by 60°. The trefoil is black in the international version, which is also used in the United States.

The symbol was adopted as a standard in the US by ANSI in 1969. It was first documented as an international symbol in 1963 in International Organization for Standardization (ISO) recommendation R.361. In 1974, after approval by national standards bodies, the symbol became an international standard as ISO 361 Basic ionizing radiation symbol. The standard specifies the shape, proportions, application and restrictions on the use of the symbol. It may be used to signify the actual or potential presence of ionizing radiation. It is not used for non-ionizing electromagnetic waves or sound waves. The standard does not specify the radiation levels at which it is to be used.

The sign is commonly referred to as a radioactivity warning sign, but it is actually a warning sign of ionizing radiation. Ionizing radiation is a much broader category than radioactivity alone, as many non-radioactive sources also emit potentially dangerous levels of ionizing radiation. This includes x-ray apparatus, radiotherapy linear accelerators, and particle accelerators. Non-ionizing radiation can also reach potentially dangerous levels, but this warning sign is different from the trefoil ionizing radiation warning symbol. The sign is not to be confused with the fallout shelter identification sign introduced by the Office of Civil Defense in 1961. This was originally intended to be the same as the radiation hazard symbol but was changed to a slightly different symbol because shelters are a place of safety, not of hazard.

On February 15, 2007, two groups—the International Atomic Energy Agency (IAEA) and the International Organization for Standardization (ISO)—jointly announced the adoption of a new ionizing radiation warning symbol to supplement the traditional trefoil symbol. The new symbol, to be used on sealed radiation sources, is aimed at alerting anyone, anywhere to the danger of being close to a strong source of ionizing radiation. It depicts, on a red background, a black trefoil with waves of radiation streaming from it, along with a black skull and crossbones, and a running figure with an arrow pointing away from the scene. The radiating trefoil suggests the presence of radiation, while the red background and the skull and crossbones warn of danger. The figure running away from the scene is meant to suggest taking action to avoid the labeled material. The new symbol is not intended to be generally visible, but rather to appear on internal components of devices that house radiation sources so that if anybody attempts to disassemble such devices they will see an explicit warning not to proceed any further.

ISO 361 International ionizing radiation trefoil symbol

Radioactive symbol with specifications

Yellow and magenta ionizing radiation trefoil used in the US

Early ionizing radiation symbol (1946)

ISO 21482 high-level sealed-source ionizing radiation symbol

== Biohazard symbol ==
☣o

Hazard symbol
- In Unicode: U+2623 ☣ BIOHAZARD SIGN

The biohazard symbol is used in the labeling of biological materials that carry a significant health risk, including viral and bacteriological samples, including infected dressings and used hypodermic needles (see sharps waste).

=== History ===
The biohazard symbol was developed in 1966 by Charles Baldwin, an environmental-health engineer working for the Dow Chemical Company on their containment products.

According to Baldwin, who was assigned by Dow to its development: "We wanted something that was memorable but meaningless, so we could educate people as to what it means." In an article in Science in 1967, the symbol was presented as the new standard for all biological hazards ("biohazards"). The article explained that over 40 symbols were drawn up by Dow's artists, and all of the symbols investigated had to meet a number of criteria: "(i) striking in form in order to draw immediate attention; (ii) unique and unambiguous, in order not to be confused with symbols used for other purposes; (iii) quickly recognizable and easily recalled; (iv) easily stenciled; (v) symmetrical, in order to appear identical from all angles of approach; and (vi) acceptable to groups of varying ethnic backgrounds." The chosen scored the best on nationwide testing for uniqueness and memorability.

=== Geometry ===
The biohazard symbol with dimensions

All parts of the biohazard sign can be drawn with a compass and straightedge. The basic outline of the symbol is a plain trefoil, which is three circles overlapping each other equally like in a triple Venn diagram with the overlapping parts erased. Then three inner circles are drawn in with 2/3 radius of the original circles so that it is tangent to the outside three overlapping circles. A tiny circle in center has a diameter 1/2 of the radius of the three inner circles, and arcs are erased at 90°, 210°, and 330°. The arcs of each of the inner circles and the tiny center circle are connected by a curved line. Finally, the ring under is drawn from the distance to the perimeter of the equilateral triangle that forms between the centers of the three intersecting circles. An outer circle of the ring under is drawn and finally enclosed with the arcs from the center of the inner circles with a shorter radius from the inner circles.

== Chemical symbols ==
A chemical hazard symbol is a pictogram applied to containers and storage areas of dangerous chemical compounds to indicate the specific hazard, and thus the required precautions. There are several systems of labels, depending on the purpose, such as on the container for transportation, containers for end-use, or on a vehicle during transportation.

Hazard	GHS (Note: Globally Harmonized System of Classification and Labelling of Chemicals)	ISO 7010	European Union Directive 92/58/EEC	European Union Directive 67/548/EEC	WHMIS 1988 (Note: Workplace Hazardous Materials Information System, Canada)
Hazard	Current		Amended	No longer used	
Explosive substance					—N/a
Flammable substance					
Oxidizing substance					
Compressed Gas			—N/a	—N/a	
Corrosive substance					
Toxic substance					
Irritant/harmful		—N/a			
Health hazard			—N/a	—N/a	
Environmental hazard			—N/a		—N/a
Biological hazard	—N/a			—N/a	
Dangerously reactive substance (Note: Reacts violently if mixed with water or subjected to impact/shock, or will vigorously polymerize or decompose.)	—N/a	—N/a	—N/a	—N/a	

=== GHS symbols and statements ===
GHS 'Flammable' Pictogram

The United Nations has designed GHS hazard pictograms and GHS hazard statements to internationally harmonize chemical hazard warnings under the Globally Harmonized System of Classification and Labelling of Chemicals. These symbols have gradually replaced nation and region specific systems such as the European Union's Directive 67/548/EEC symbols, Canada's Workplace Hazardous Materials Information System. It has also been adopted in the United States for materials being sold and shipped by manufacturers, distributors and importers. The USA previously did not mandate a specific system, instead allowing any system, provided it had met certain requirements.

=== Europe ===
The European Union employs a standardized system of hazard symbols to communicate the risks associated with chemicals and other hazardous substances. These symbols are regulated primarily under the Classification, Labelling and Packaging (CLP) Regulation, which aligns the EU with the Globally Harmonized System of Classification and Labelling of Chemicals (GHS) developed by the United Nations.

==== CLP Regulation (EC) No 1272/2008 ====
Implemented on January 20, 2009, the CLP Regulation replaced previous EU directives such as:

- The Dangerous Substances Directive (67/548/EEC)
- The Dangerous Preparations Directive (1999/45/EC)

The regulation ensures that the hazards presented by chemicals are clearly communicated through standardized labels and hazard pictograms, allowing safe use, handling, and transport throughout the EU.

Former CLP 'Flammable' symbol

==== Transition from Old Symbols ====
Before the adoption of GHS, the EU used orange square symbols under the Dangerous Substances Directive. These included:

- A black "X" for irritant/harmful
- A skull and crossbones for toxic
- A black flame for flammable

These older symbols were phased out by June 1, 2015.

=== Canada ===
Example WHMIS symbol

The Workplace Hazardous Materials Information System, or WHMIS, is Canada's national workplace hazard communication standard, first introduced in 1988, and included eight chemical hazard symbols. This system was brought into alignment with GHS in 2015, with a gradual phase in of GHS symbols and label designs through 15 December 2025. The WHMIS system does deviate from GHS by retaining the former WHMIS symbol for Class 3, Division 3, biohazardous infectious materials, as GHS lacks a biological hazard symbol.

== Non-standard symbols ==
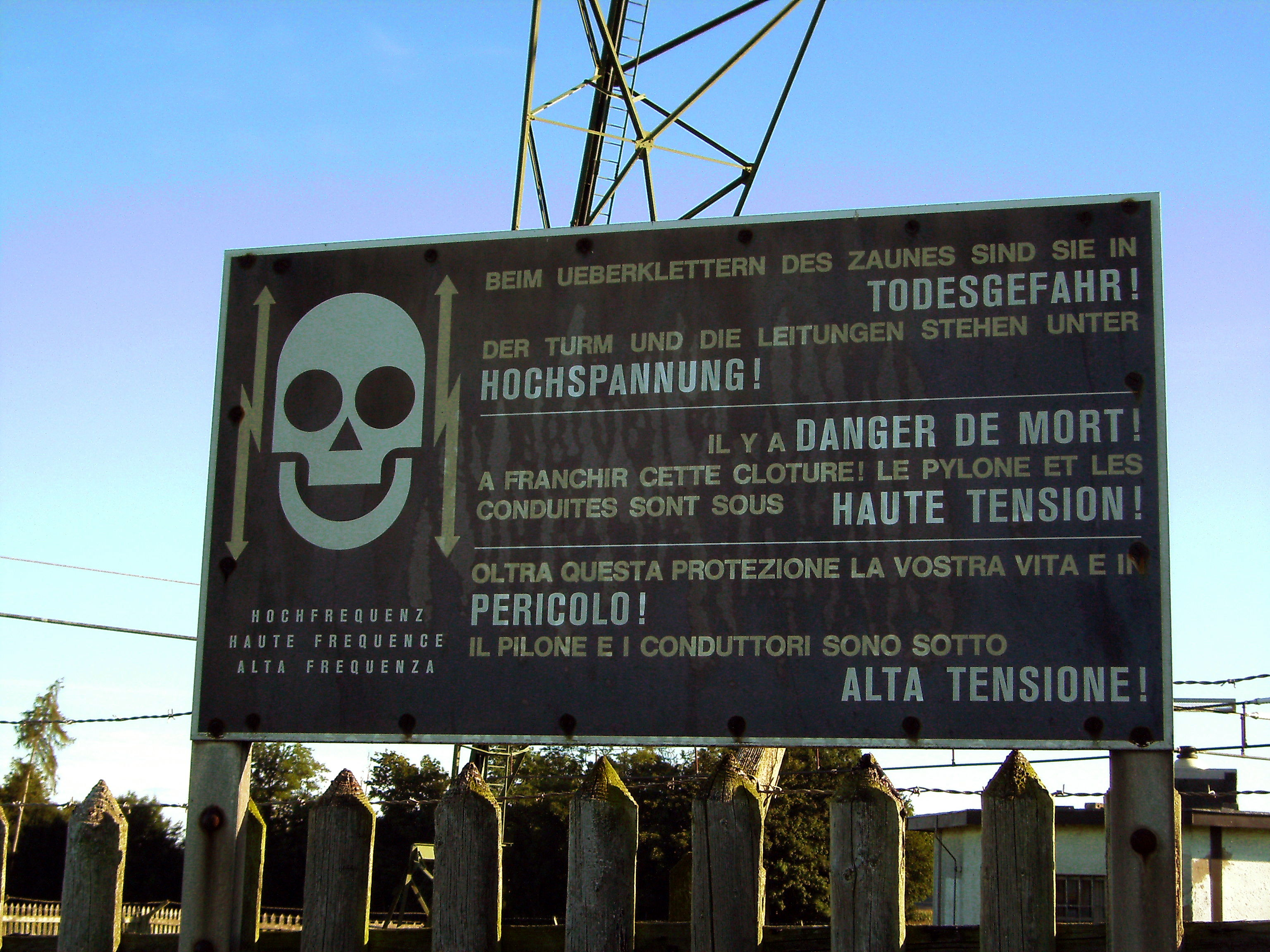
Sign on a fence around the Beromünster Reserve Broadcasting Tower in Switzerland, warning of high voltage and danger of death

A large number of warning symbols with non-standard designs are in use around the world.

Some warning symbols have been redesigned to be more comprehensible to children, such as the Mr. Ouch (depicting an electricity danger as a snarling, spiky creature) and Mr. Yuk (a green frowny face sticking its tongue out, to represent poison) designs in the United States.

== See also ==
- Bouba/kiki effect – Non-arbitrary attachment of sounds to object shapes
- Pictogram
- ISO 7010 – ISO standard for safety symbols
- ISO 7001 – ISO standard for public information symbols.
- GHS hazard pictograms – Symbols used by the Globally Harmonized System of Classification and Labelling of Chemicals
- Safety sign
