= GHS hazard statements =

Expression of danger in substances

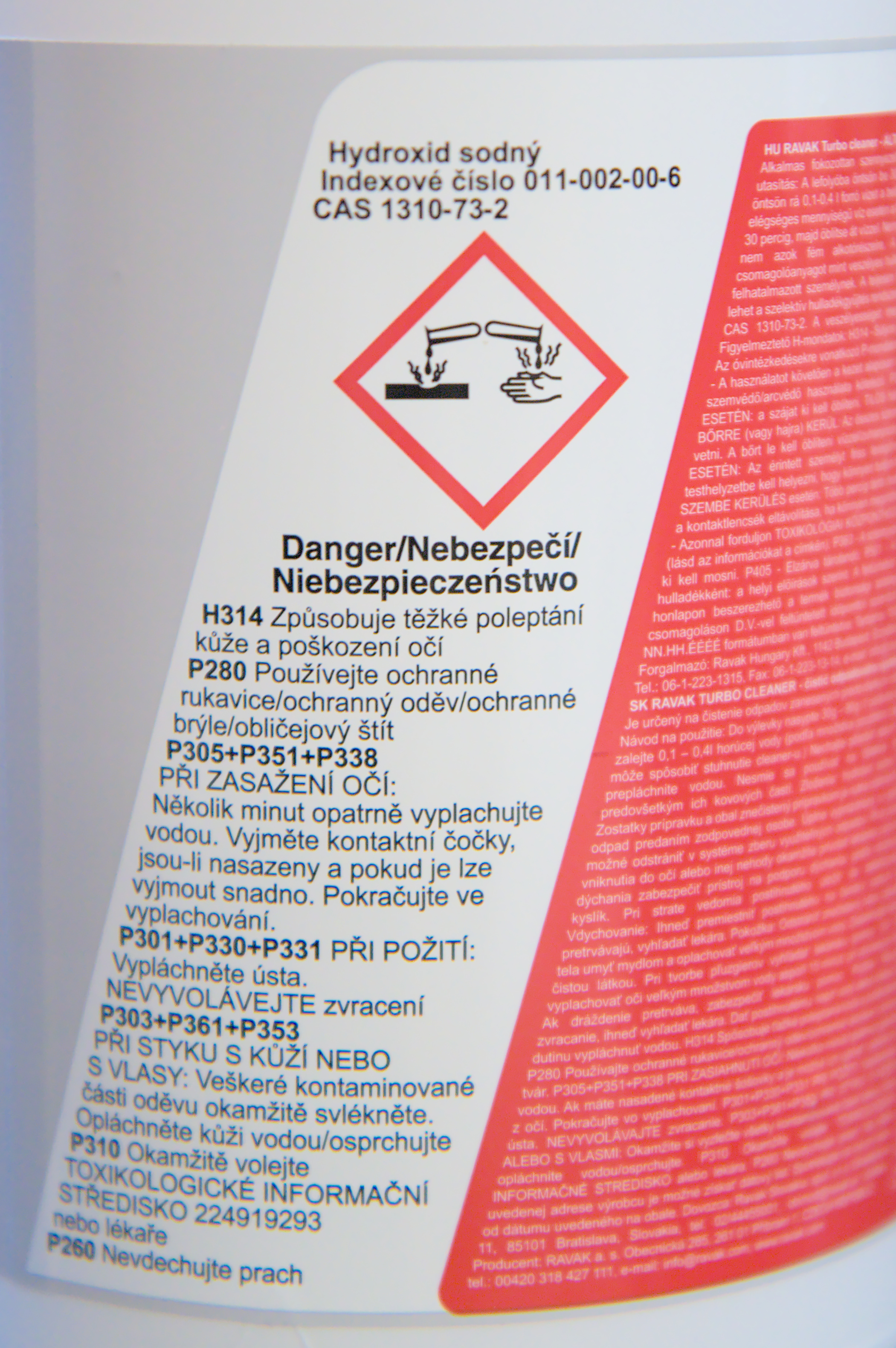
Bottle of “RAVAK Turbo Cleaner” drain cleaner containing sodium hydroxide, labelled with chemical hazard information per the GHS standard

Hazard statements form part of the Globally Harmonized System of Classification and Labelling of Chemicals (GHS). They are intended to form a set of standardized phrases about the hazards of chemical substances and mixtures that can be translated into different languages. (Note: The United Nations has published the list of GHS hazard statements in all UN official languages (Arabic, Chinese, English, French, Russian, Spanish): it can be found in Annex 3 of GHS Rev.2 for the corresponding language.) (Note: A list of translations into all the European Union official languages can be found in Annex III to the CLP Regulation, on pages 146–91 of the official English-language version for the GHS statements and pages 192–209 for the EU-specific statements.) As such, they serve the same purpose as the well-known R-phrases, which they are intended to replace.

Hazard statements are one of the key elements for the labelling of containers under the GHS, along with:

- an identification of the product
- one or more hazard pictograms (where necessary)
- a signal word – either Danger or Warning – where necessary
- precautionary statements, indicating how the product should be handled to minimize risks to the user (as well as to other people and the general environment)
- the identity of the supplier (who might be a manufacturer or importer).

Each hazard statement is designated a code, starting with the letter H and followed by three digits. Statements which correspond to related hazards are grouped together by code number, so the numbering is not consecutive. The code is used for reference purposes, for example to help with translations, but it is the actual phrase which should appear on labels and safety data sheets.

== Physical hazards ==
GHS H-phrases (42)
| Code | Phrase |
|---|---|
| H200 | (Obsolete) Unstable explosive. |
| H201 | (Obsolete) Explosive: mass explosion hazard. |
| H202 | (Obsolete) Explosive: severe projection hazard. |
| H203 | (Obsolete) Explosive: fire, blast or projection hazard. |
| H204 | Fire or projection hazard. |
| H205 | (Obsolete) May mass explode in fire. |
| H206 | Fire, blast or projection hazard: increased risk of explosion if desensitizing agent is reduced. |
| H207 | Fire or projection hazard; increased risk of explosion if desensitizing agent is reduced. |
| H208 | Fire hazard; increased risk of explosion if desensitizing agent is reduced. |
| H209 | Explosive. |
| H210 | Very explosive. |
| H211 | May be sensitive. |
| H220 | Extremely flammable gas. |
| H221 | Flammable gas. |
| H222 | Extremely flammable aerosol. |
| H223 | Flammable aerosol. |
| H224 | Extremely flammable liquid and vapour. |
| H225 | Highly flammable liquid and vapour. |
| H226 | Flammable liquid and vapour. |
| H227 | Combustible liquid. |
| H228 | Flammable solid. |
| H229 | Pressurized container: may burst if heated. |
| H230 | May react explosively even in the absence of air. |
| H231 | May react explosively even in the absence of air at elevated pressure and/or temperature. |
| H232 | May ignite spontaneously if exposed to air. |
| H240 | Heating may cause an explosion. |
| H241 | Heating may cause a fire or explosion. |
| H242 | Heating may cause a fire. |
| H250 | Catches fire spontaneously if exposed to air. |
| H251 | Self-heating: may catch fire. |
| H252 | Self-heating in large quantities: may catch fire. |
| H260 | In contact with water releases flammable gases which may ignite spontaneously. |
| H261 | In contact with water releases flammable gas. |
| H270 | May cause or intensify fire: oxidizer. |
| H271 | May cause fire or explosion: strong oxidizer. |
| H272 | May intensify fire: oxidizer. |
| H280 | Contains gas under pressure: may explode if heated. |
| H281 | Contains refrigerated gas: may cause cryogenic burns or injury. |
| H282 | Extremely flammable chemical under pressure: May explode if heated. |
| H283 | Flammable chemical under pressure: May explode if heated. |
| H284 | Chemical under pressure: May explode if heated. |
| H290 | May be corrosive to metals. |

== Health hazards ==
GHS H-phrases (62)
| Code | Phrase |
|---|---|
| H300 | Fatal if swallowed. |
| H300+H310 | Fatal if swallowed or in contact with skin. |
| H300+H310+H330 | Fatal if swallowed, in contact with skin or if inhaled. |
| H300+H330 | Fatal if swallowed or if inhaled. |
| H301 | Toxic if swallowed. |
| H301+H311 | Toxic if swallowed or in contact with skin. |
| H301+H311+H331 | Toxic if swallowed, in contact with skin or if inhaled. |
| H301+H331 | Toxic if swallowed or if inhaled. |
| H302 | Harmful if swallowed. |
| H302+H312 | Harmful if swallowed or in contact with skin. |
| H302+H312+H332 | Harmful if swallowed, in contact with skin or if inhaled. |
| H302+H332 | Harmful if swallowed or inhaled. |
| H303 | May be harmful if swallowed. |
| H303+H313 | May be harmful if swallowed or in contact with skin. |
| H303+H313+H333 | May be harmful if swallowed, in contact with skin or if inhaled. |
| H303+H333 | May be harmful if swallowed or if inhaled. |
| H304 | May be fatal if swallowed and enters airways. |
| H305 | May be harmful if swallowed and enters airways. |
| H310 | Fatal in contact with skin. |
| H310+H330 | Fatal in contact with skin or if inhaled. |
| H311 | Toxic in contact with skin. |
| H311+H331 | Toxic in contact with skin or if inhaled. |
| H312 | Harmful in contact with skin. |
| H312+H332 | Harmful in contact with skin or if inhaled. |
| H313 | May be harmful in contact with skin. |
| H313+H333 | May be harmful in contact with skin or if inhaled. |
| H314 | Causes severe skin burns and eye damage. |
| H315 | Causes skin irritation. |
| H315+H319 | Causes skin irritation and serious eye irritation. |
| H315+H320 | Causes skin and eye irritation. |
| H316 | Causes mild skin irritation. |
| H317 | May cause an allergic skin reaction. |
| H318 | Causes serious eye damage. |
| H319 | Causes serious eye irritation. |
| H320 | Causes eye irritation. |
| H330 | Fatal if inhaled. |
| H331 | Toxic if inhaled. |
| H332 | Harmful if inhaled. |
| H333 | May be harmful if inhaled. |
| H334 | May cause allergy or asthma symptoms of breathing difficulties if inhaled. |
| H335 | May cause respiratory irritation. |
| H336 | May cause drowsiness or dizziness. |
| H340 | May cause genetic defects. |
| H341 | Suspected of causing genetic defects. |
| H350 | May cause cancer. |
| H350i | May cause cancer by inhalation. |
| H351 | Suspected of causing cancer. |
| H360 | May damage fertility or the unborn child. |
| H360D | May damage the unborn child. |
| H360Df | May damage the unborn child. Suspected of damaging fertility. |
| H360F | May damage fertility. |
| H360FD | May damage fertility. May damage the unborn child. |
| H360Fd | May damage fertility. Suspected of damaging the unborn child. |
| H361 | Suspected of damaging fertility or the unborn child. |
| H361d | Suspected of damaging the unborn child. |
| H361f | Suspected of damaging fertility. |
| H361fd | Suspected of damaging fertility. Suspected of damaging the unborn child. |
| H362 | May cause harm to breast-fed children. |
| H370 | Causes damage to organs. |
| H371 | May cause damage to organs. |
| H372 | Causes damage to organs through prolonged or repeated exposure. |
| H373 | May cause damage to organs through prolonged or repeated exposure. |

== Environmental hazards ==
GHS H-phrases (10)
| Code | Phrase |
|---|---|
| H400 | Very toxic to aquatic life. |
| H401 | Toxic to aquatic life. |
| H402 | Harmful to aquatic life. |
| H410 | Very toxic to aquatic life with long lasting effects. |
| H411 | Toxic to aquatic life with long lasting effects. |
| H412 | Harmful to aquatic life with long lasting effects. |
| H413 | May cause long lasting harmful effects to aquatic life. |
| H420 | Harms public health and the environment by destroying ozone in the upper atmosphere. |
| H421 | Harms public health and the environment by contributing to global warming. |
| H441 | (Obsolete) Very toxic to terrestrial invertebrates. |

== Region-specific hazard statements ==
=== European Union ===
The European Union has implemented the GHS through the CLP Regulation. Nevertheless, the older system based on the Dangerous Substances Directive was used in parallel until June 2015. Some R-phrases which do not have simple equivalents under the GHS have been retained under the CLP Regulation: the numbering mirrors the number of the previous R-phrase.

==== Physical properties ====
- EUH006: Explosive with or without contact with air, deleted in the fourth adaptation to technical progress of CLP
- EUH014: Reacts violently with water
- EUH018: In use may form flammable/explosive vapour-air mixture
- EUH019: May form explosive peroxides
- EUH044: Risk of explosion if heated under confinement

==== Health properties ====
- EUH029: Contact with water liberates toxic gas
- EUH031: Contact with acids liberates toxic gas
- EUH032: Contact with acids liberates very toxic gas
- EUH066: Repeated exposure may cause skin dryness or cracking
- EUH070: Toxic by eye contact
- EUH071: Corrosive to the respiratory tract
- EUH380: May cause endocrine disruption in humans
- EUH381: Suspected of causing endocrine disruption in humans

==== Environmental properties ====
- EUH059: Hazardous to the ozone layer, superseded by GHS Class 5.1 in the second adaptation to technical progress of CLP.
- EUH430: May cause endocrine disruption in the environment
- EUH431: Suspected of causing endocrine disruption in the environment
- EUH440: Accumulates in the environment and living organisms including in humans
- EUH441: Strongly accumulates in the environment and living organisms including in humans
- EUH450: Can cause long-lasting and diffuse contamination of water resources
- EUH451: Can cause very long-lasting and diffuse contamination of water resources

==== Other EU hazard statements ====
Some other hazard statements intended for use in very specific circumstances have also been retained under the CLP Regulation. In this case, the numbering of the EU specific hazard statements can coincide with GHS hazard statements if the "EU" prefix is not included.

- EUH201: Contains lead. Should not be used on surfaces liable to be chewed or sucked by children.
  - EUH201A: Warning! Contains lead.
- EUH202: Cyanoacrylate. Danger. Bonds skin and eyes in seconds. Keep out of the reach of children.
- EUH203: Contains chromium(VI). May produce an allergic reaction.
- EUH204: Contains isocyanates. May produce an allergic reaction.
- EUH205: Contains epoxy constituents. May produce an allergic reaction.
- EUH206: Warning! Do not use together with other products. May release dangerous gases (chlorine).
- EUH207: Warning! Contains cadmium. Dangerous fumes are formed during use. See information supplied by the manufacturer. Comply with the safety instructions.
- EUH208: Contains <name of sensitising substance>. May produce an allergic reaction.
- EUH209: Can become highly flammable in use.
  - EUH209A: Can become flammable in use.
- EUH210: Safety data sheet available on request.
- EUH211: Warning! Hazardous respirable droplets may be formed when sprayed. Do not breathe spray or mist.
- EUH212: Warning! Hazardous respirable dust may be formed when used. Do not breathe dust.
- EUH401: To avoid risks to human health and the environment, comply with the instructions for use.

=== Australia ===
The GHS was adopted in Australia from 1 January 2012 and is mandatory in States and Territories that have adopted the harmonised Work Health and Safety laws (other than Victoria and Western Australia) as of 1 January 2017. The National Code of Practice for the Preparation of Safety Data Sheets for Hazardous Chemicals includes 12 Australian-specific GHS Hazard Statements, as follows:

==== Physical hazard statements ====
- AUH001: Explosive without moisture
- AUH006: Explosive with or without contact with air
- AUH014: Reacts violently with water
- AUH018: In use, may form a flammable/explosive vapor-air mixture
- AUH019: May form explosive peroxides
- AUH044: Risk of explosion if heated under confinement

==== Human health hazard statements ====
- AUH029: Contact with water liberates toxic gas
- AUH031: Contact with acids liberates toxic gas

==== Additional non-GHS hazard statements ====
- AUH032: Contact with acids liberates very toxic gas
- AUH066: Repeated exposure may cause skin dryness or cracking
- AUH070: Toxic by eye contact
- AUH071: Corrosive to the respiratory tract

=== New Zealand ===
As of March 2009, the relevant New Zealand regulations under the Hazardous Substances and New Organisms Act 1996 do not specify the exact wording required for hazard statements. However, the New Zealand classification system includes three categories of environmental hazard which are not included in the GHS Rev.2:

- Ecotoxicity to soil environment
- Ecotoxicity to terrestrial vertebrates
- Ecotoxicity to terrestrial invertebrates

These are classes 9.2–9.4 respectively of the New Zealand classification scheme, and are divided into subclasses according to the degree of hazard. Substances in subclass 9.2D ("Substances that are slightly harmful in the soil environment") do not require a hazard statement, while substances in the other subclasses require an indication of the general degree of hazard and general type of hazard.
