= Iseult Lynch =

Irish chemist and Professor

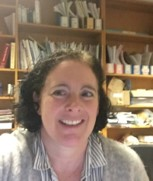
- Born: 27/06/1973
- Education: University College Dublin
- Awards: John Jeyes Award 2020
- Scientific career
- Fields: Nanoscience
- Workplaces: University College Dublin, University of Birmingham

Iseult Lynch is an Irish chemist and Professor of Environmental Nanoscience at the School of Geography, Earth and Environmental Sciences at the University of Birmingham. Her research focuses on the safety of nanoparticles in the environment and their interactions with biological entities.

== Early life and education ==
Lynch is from Dublin, Ireland. Her parents are Maura (Mary Catherine nee King) and Mark R. Lynch, and she has 3 siblings – Daire, Mark and Michelle. Her father was posthumously awarded the 2019 IUPAC International Award for Advances in Harmonized Approaches to Crop Protection Chemistry from the IUPAC Division on Chemistry and the Environment.

She completed a BSc in Chemistry in 1995, a PhD in Physical Chemistry in 2000 and went on to complete an MBA in 2012, all at University College Dublin.

== Career ==
She undertook her PhD in the Irish Centre for Colloid Science and Biomaterials, and then postdoctoral research, including a Marie Curie Individual Fellowship, at Physical Chemistry 1, Lund University, before returning to University College Dublin to support the establishment of the Centre for BioNano Interactions, where she was a researcher and Strategic Research Manager until early 2013. Lynch moved to the University of Birmingham in March 2013, joining the School of Geography, Earth and Environmental Sciences. Her work centres on nanoplastics, which range in size from 1 – 100 nanometers (nm), and microplastics.

She specialises in the environmental health and safety implications of engineering nanomaterials and nanoscale plastic waste. She has investigated the impact of water pollution on daphnia (also known as water fleas), specifically looking at how these plastics enter their gut. Her research has demonstrated that daphnia release proteins that attach in a process known as adsorption, which changes how organisms interact with the nanoplastics.

== Awards ==
- Proceedings of the National Academy of Sciences Cozzarelli Prize for best publication in Class I: Physical and Mathematical Sciences in 2007
- Royal Society of Chemistry John Jeyes Award 2020
- Society for Environmental Toxicology and Chemistry (SETAC) Noack Laboratorien Outstanding Science Award 2021
- Clarivate Highly Cited Researcher in 2018
- Clarivate Highly Cited Researcher in 2022

== Selected publications ==
- Cedervall, T.; Lynch, I.; Lindman, S.; Berggard, T.; Thulin, E.; Nilsson, H.; Dawson, K. A.; Linse, S. (31 January 2007). "Understanding the nanoparticle-protein corona using methods to quantify exchange rates and affinities of proteins for nanoparticles". Proceedings of the National Academy of Sciences. 104 (7): 2050–2055. doi:10.1073/pnas.0608582104. ISSN 0027-8424. PMC 1892985. PMID 17267609.
- Lundqvist, Martin; Stigler, Johannes; Elia, Giuliano; Lynch, Iseult; Cedervall, Tommy; Dawson, Kenneth A. (23 September 2008). "Nanoparticle size and surface properties determine the protein corona with possible implications for biological impacts". Proceedings of the National Academy of Sciences. 105 (38): 14265–14270. Bibcode:2008PNAS..10514265L. doi:10.1073/pnas.0805135105. ISSN 0027-8424. PMC 2567179. PMID 18809927.
- Lynch, Iseult; Dawson, Kenneth A. (1 February 2008). "Protein-nanoparticle interactions". Nano Today. 3 (1): 40–47. doi:10.1016/S1748-0132(08)70014-8. ISSN 1748-0132. S2CID 135634640.
- Valsami-Jones, Eugenia; Lynch, Iseult (23 October 2015). "How safe are nanomaterials?". Science. 350 (6259): 388–389. Bibcode:2015Sci...350..388V. doi:10.1126/science.aad0768. ISSN 0036-8075. PMID 26494749. S2CID 206641837.
