= List of R-phrases =

Standardised phrases specifying risks associated with substances

R-phrases (short for risk phrases) are defined in Annex III of European Union Directive 67/548/EEC: Nature of special risks attributed to dangerous substances and preparations. The list was consolidated and republished in Directive 2001/59/EC, where translations into other EU languages may be found.

These risk phrases are used internationally, not just in Europe, and there is an ongoing effort towards complete international harmonization using the Globally Harmonized System of Classification and Labelling of Chemicals (GHS) which now generally replaces these risk phrases.

== Risk phrases ==
Code	Phrase
R1	Explosive when dry
R2	Risk of explosion by shock, friction, fire, or other sources of ignition
R3	Extreme risk of explosion by shock, friction, fire, or other sources of ignition
R4	Forms very sensitive explosive metallic compounds
R5	Heating may cause an explosion
R6	Explosive with or without contact with air
R7	May cause fire
R8	Contact with combustible material may cause fire
R9	Explosive when mixed with combustible material
R10	Flammable
R11	Highly flammable
R12	Extremely flammable
R13	Extremely flammable liquefied gas (No longer used, removed from regulations)
R14	Reacts violently with water
R15	Contact with water liberates extremely flammable gases
R16	Explosive when mixed with oxidising substances
R17	Spontaneously flammable in air
R18	In use, may form flammable/explosive vapour-air mixture
R19	May form explosive peroxides
R20	Harmful by inhalation
R21	Harmful in contact with skin
R22	Harmful if swallowed
R23	Toxic by inhalation
R24	Toxic in contact with skin
R25	Toxic if swallowed
R26	Very toxic by inhalation
R27	Very toxic in contact with skin
R28	Very toxic if swallowed
R29	Contact with water liberates toxic gas.
R30	Can become highly flammable in use
R31	Contact with acids liberates toxic gas
R32	Contact with acids liberates very toxic gas
R33	Danger of cumulative effects
R34	Causes burns
R35	Causes severe burns
R36	Irritating to eyes
R37	Irritating to respiratory system
R38	Irritating to skin
R39	Danger of very serious irreversible effects
R40	Limited evidence of a carcinogenic effect
R41	Risk of serious damage to eyes
R42	May cause sensitisation by inhalation
R43	May cause sensitisation by skin contact
R44	Risk of explosion if heated under confinement
R45	May cause cancer
R46	May cause heritable genetic damage
R47	May cause birth defects (No longer used, removed from regulations)
R48	Danger of serious damage to health by prolonged exposure
R49	May cause cancer by inhalation
R50	Very toxic to aquatic organisms
R51	Toxic to aquatic organisms
R52	Harmful to aquatic organisms
R53	May cause long-term adverse effects in the aquatic environment
R54	Toxic to flora
R55	Toxic to fauna
R56	Toxic to soil organisms
R57	Toxic to bees
R58	May cause long-term adverse effects in the environment
R59	Dangerous for the ozone layer
R60	May impair fertility
R61	May cause harm to the unborn child
R62	Possible risk of impaired fertility
R63	Possible risk of harm to the unborn child
R64	May cause harm to breastfed babies
R65	Harmful: may cause lung damage if swallowed
R66	Repeated exposure may cause skin dryness or cracking
R67	Vapours may cause drowsiness and dizziness
R68	Possible risk of irreversible effects

== Combinations ==
Code Combination	Statement
R14/15	Reacts violently with water, liberating extremely flammable gases
R15/29	Contact with water liberates toxic, extremely flammable gases
R14/15/29	Reacts violently with water, liberating toxic, extremely flammable gases
R20/21	Harmful by inhalation and in contact with skin
R20/22	Harmful by inhalation and if swallowed
R20/21/22	Harmful by inhalation, in contact with skin and if swallowed
R21/22	Harmful in contact with skin and if swallowed
R23/24	Toxic by inhalation and in contact with skin
R23/25	Toxic by inhalation and if swallowed
R23/24/25	Toxic by inhalation, in contact with skin and if swallowed
R24/25	Toxic in contact with skin and if swallowed
R26/27	Very toxic by inhalation and in contact with skin
R26/28	Very toxic by inhalation and if swallowed
R26/27/28	Very toxic by inhalation, in contact with skin and if swallowed
R27/28	Very toxic in contact with skin and if swallowed
R36/37	Irritating to eyes and respiratory system
R36/38	Irritating to eyes and skin
R36/37/38	Irritating to eyes, respiratory system and skin
R37/38	Irritating to respiratory system and skin
R39/23	Toxic: danger of very serious irreversible effects through inhalation
R39/24	Toxic: danger of very serious irreversible effects in contact with skin
R39/25	Toxic: danger of very serious irreversible effects if swallowed
R39/23/24	Toxic: danger of very serious irreversible effects through inhalation and in contact with skin
R39/23/25	Toxic: danger of very serious irreversible effects through inhalation and if swallowed
R39/24/25	Toxic: danger of very serious irreversible effects in contact with skin and if swallowed
R39/23/24/25	Toxic: danger of very serious irreversible effects through inhalation, in contact with skin and if swallowed
R39/26	Very Toxic: danger of very serious irreversible effects through inhalation
R39/27	Very Toxic: danger of very serious irreversible effects in contact with skin
R39/28	Very Toxic: danger of very serious irreversible effects if swallowed
R39/26/27	Very Toxic: danger of very serious irreversible effects through inhalation and in contact with skin
R39/26/28	Very Toxic: danger of very serious irreversible effects through inhalation and if swallowed
R39/27/28	Very Toxic: danger of very serious irreversible effects in contact with skin and if swallowed
R39/26/27/28	Very Toxic: danger of very serious irreversible effects through inhalation, in contact with skin and if swallowed
R42/43	May cause sensitization by inhalation and skin contact
R45/46	May cause cancer and heritable genetic damage
R48/20	Harmful: danger of serious damage to health by prolonged exposure through inhalation
R48/21	Harmful: danger of serious damage to health by prolonged exposure in contact with skin
R48/22	Harmful: danger of serious damage to health by prolonged exposure if swallowed
R48/20/21	Harmful: danger of serious damage to health by prolonged exposure through inhalation and in contact with skin
R48/20/22	Harmful: danger of serious damage to health by prolonged exposure through inhalation and if swallowed
R48/21/22	Harmful: danger of serious damage to health by prolonged exposure in contact with skin and if swallowed
R48/20/21/22	Harmful: danger of serious damage to health by prolonged exposure through inhalation, in contact with skin and if swallowed
R48/23	Toxic: danger of serious damage to health by prolonged exposure through inhalation
R48/24	Toxic: danger of serious damage to health by prolonged exposure in contact with skin
R48/25	Toxic: danger of serious damage to health by prolonged exposure if swallowed
R48/23/24	Toxic: danger of serious damage to health by prolonged exposure through inhalation and in contact with skin
R48/23/25	Toxic: danger of serious damage to health by prolonged exposure through inhalation and if swallowed
R48/24/25	Toxic: danger of serious damage to health by prolonged exposure in contact with skin and if swallowed
R48/23/24/25	Toxic: danger of serious damage to health by prolonged exposure through inhalation, in contact with skin and if swallowed
R50/53	Very toxic to aquatic organisms, may cause long-term adverse effects in the aquatic environment
R51/53	Toxic to aquatic organisms, may cause long-term adverse effects in the aquatic environment
R52/53	Harmful to aquatic organisms, may cause long-term adverse effects in the aquatic environment
R68/20	Harmful: possible risk of irreversible effects through inhalation
R68/21	Harmful: possible risk of irreversible effects in contact with skin
R68/22	Harmful: possible risk of irreversible effects if swallowed
R68/20/21	Harmful: possible risk of irreversible effects through inhalation and in contact with skin
R68/20/22	Harmful: possible risk of irreversible effects through inhalation and if swallowed
R68/21/22	Harmful: possible risk of irreversible effects in contact with skin and if swallowed
R68/20/21/22	Harmful: possible risk of irreversible effects through inhalation, in contact with skin and if swallowed

== See also ==
- List of S-phrases
- Material safety data sheet
- Risk and Safety Statements
