= GHS precautionary statements =

Standardized phrase giving advice about the correct handling of a dangerous chemical

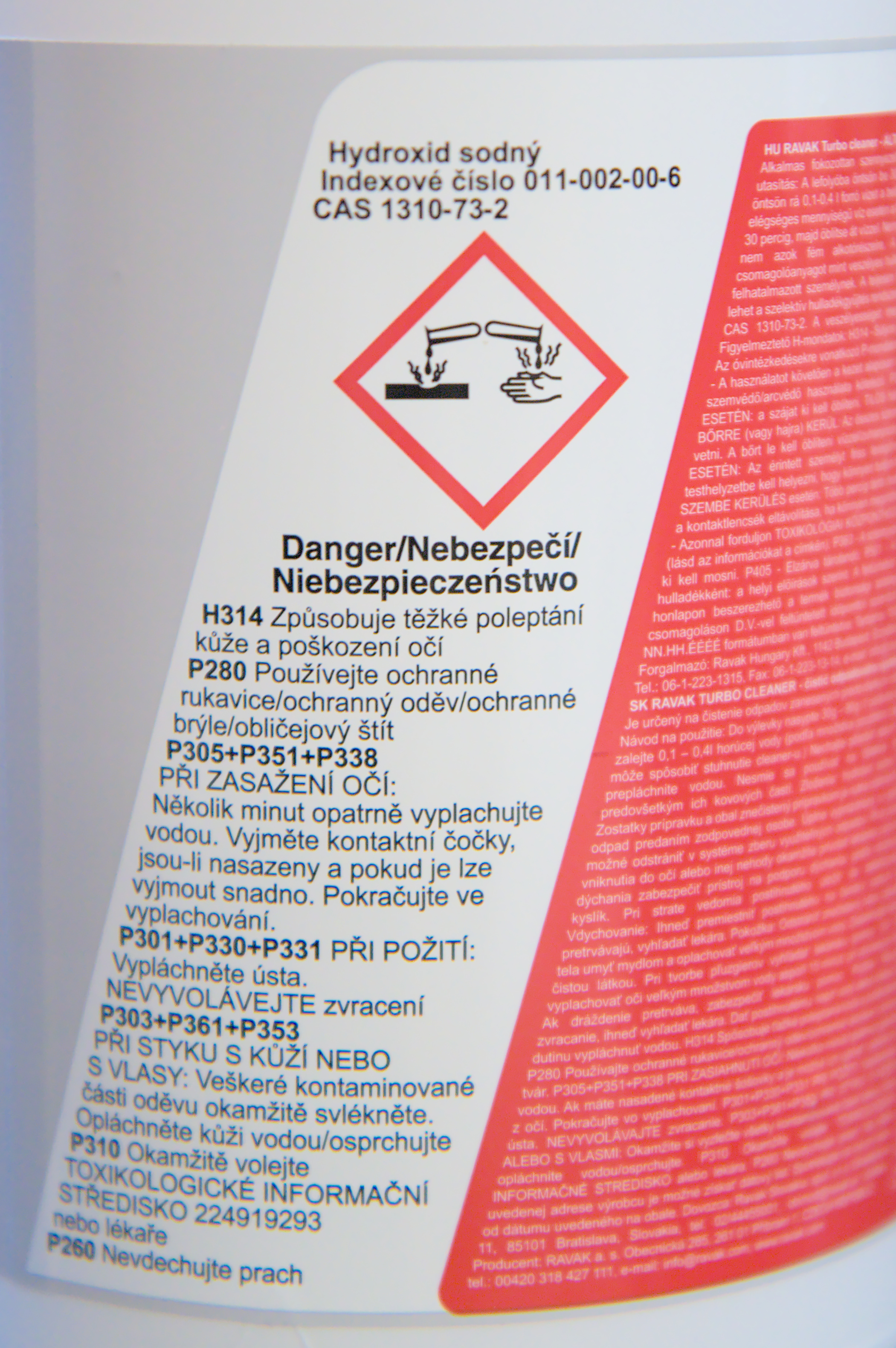
Bottle of “RAVAK Turbo Cleaner” drain cleaner containing sodium hydroxide, labelled with chemical hazard information per the GHS standard

Precautionary statements form part of the Globally Harmonized System of Classification and Labelling of Chemicals (GHS). They are intended to form a set of standardized phrases giving advice about the correct handling of chemical substances and mixtures, which can be translated into different languages. (Note: The United Nations has published the list of GHS precautionary statements in all UN official languages (Arabic, Chinese, English, French, Russian, Spanish): it can be found in Annex 3 of GHS Rev.2 for the corresponding language.) (Note: A list of translations into all the European Union official languages can be found in Annex IV to the CLP Regulation, on pages 210–324 of the official English-language version.) As such, they serve the same purpose as the well-known S-phrases, which they are intended to replace.

Precautionary statements are one of the key elements for the labelling of containers under the GHS, along with:

- an identification of the product;
- one or more hazard pictograms (where necessary)
- a signal word – either Danger or Warning – where necessary
- hazard statements, indicating the nature and degree of the risks posed by the product
- the identity of the supplier (who might be a manufacturer or importer)

Each precautionary statement is designated a code, starting with the letter P and followed by three digits. Statements which correspond to related hazards are grouped together by code number, so the numbering is not consecutive. The code is used for reference purposes, for example to help with translations, but it is the actual phrase which should appear on labels and safety data sheets. Some precautionary phrases are combinations, indicated by a plus sign "+". In several cases, there is a choice of wording, for example "Avoid breathing dust/fume/gas/mist/vapours/spray": the supplier or regulatory agency should choose the appropriate wording for the product concerned.

== General precautionary statements ==
GHS P-phrases (3)
Code	Phrase
P101	If medical advice is needed, have product container or label at hand.
P102	Keep out of reach of children.
P103	Read carefully and follow all instructions.

== Prevention precautionary statements ==
GHS P-phrases (43)
Code	Phrase
P201	(Obsolete) Obtain special instructions before use.
P202	(Obsolete) Do not handle until all safety precautions have been read and understood.
P203	Obtain, read and follow all safety instructions before use.
P210	Keep away from heat, hot surfaces, sparks, open flames and other ignition sources. No smoking.
P211	Do not spray on an open flame or other ignition source.
P212	Avoid heating under confinement or reduction of the desensitized agent.
P220	Keep away from clothing and other combustible materials.
P221	(Obsolete) Take any precaution to avoid mixing with combustibles/...
P222	Do not allow contact with air.
P223	Do not allow contact with water.
P230	Keep diluted with ...
P231	Handle and store contents under inert gas/...
P231+P232	Handle and store contents under inert gas/... Protect from moisture.
P232	Protect from moisture.
P233	Keep container tightly closed.
P234	Keep only in original container.
P235	Keep cool.
P235+P410	(Obsolete) Keep cool. Protect from sunlight.
P236	Keep only in original packaging; Division ... in the transport configuration.
P240	Ground and bond container and receiving equipment.
P241	Use explosion-proof [electrical/ventilating/lighting/...] equipment.
P242	Use non-sparking tools.
P243	Take action to prevent static discharges.
P244	Keep valves and fittings free from oil and grease
P250	Do not subject to grinding/shock/friction/...
P251	Do not pierce or burn, even after use.
P260	Do not breathe dust/fume/gas/mist/vapours/spray.
P261	Avoid breathing dust/fume/gas/mist/vapours/spray.
P262	Do not get in eyes, on skin, or on clothing.
P263	Avoid contact during pregnancy and while nursing.
P264	Wash hands [and ...] thoroughly after handling.
P264+P265	Wash hands [and ...] thoroughly after handling. Do not touch eyes.
P265	Do not touch eyes.
P270	Do not eat, drink or smoke when using this product.
P271	Use only outdoors or with adequate ventilation.
P272	Contaminated work clothing should not be allowed out of the workplace.
P273	Avoid release to the environment.
P280	Wear protective gloves/protective clothing/eye protection/face protection/hearing protection/...
P281	(Obsolete) Use personal protective equipment as required.
P282	Wear cold insulating gloves and either face shield or eye protection.
P283	Wear fire resistant or flame-retardant clothing.
P284	In case of inadequate ventilation wear respiratory protection.
P285	(Obsolete) In case of inadequate ventilation wear respiratory protection.

== Response precautionary statements ==
GHS P-phrases (114)
Code	Phrase
P301	IF SWALLOWED:
P301+P310	(Obsolete) IF SWALLOWED: Immediately call a POISON CENTER or doctor/physician.
P301+P310+P330	(Obsolete) IF SWALLOWED: Immediately call a POISON CENTER or doctor/physician. Rinse mouth.
P301+P312	(Obsolete) IF SWALLOWED: Call a POISON CENTER or doctor/physician if you feel unwell.
P301+P312+P330	(Obsolete) IF SWALLOWED: Call a POISON CENTER or doctor/physician if you feel unwell. Rinse mouth.
P301+P316	IF SWALLOWED: Get emergency medical help immediately.
P301+P317	IF SWALLOWED: IF SWALLOWED: Get medical help.
P301+P330+P331	IF SWALLOWED: Rinse mouth. Do NOT induce vomiting.
P302	IF ON SKIN:
P302+P312	(Obsolete) IF ON SKIN: Call a POISON CENTER or doctor/physician if you feel unwell.
P302+P317	(Obsolete) IF ON SKIN: Get medical help.
P302+P334	IF ON SKIN: Immerse in cool water or wrap in wet bandages.
P302+P335+P334	IF ON SKIN: Brush off loose particles from skin and immerse in cool water [or wrap in wet bandages].
P302+P350	(Obsolete) IF ON SKIN: Gently wash with soap and water.
P302+P352	IF ON SKIN: Wash with plenty of water/...
P302+P352+P312	(Obsolete) IF ON SKIN: Wash with soap and water. Call a POISON CENTER or doctor/physician if you feel unwell.
P302+P361+P354	IF ON SKIN: Take off immediately all contaminated clothing. Immediately rinse with water for several minutes.
P303	IF ON SKIN (or hair):
P303+P361+P353	IF ON SKIN (or hair): Remove/Take off immediately all contaminated clothing. Rinse skin with water [or shower].
P303+P361+P353+P315	(Obsolete) IF ON SKIN (or hair): Remove/Take off immediately all contaminated clothing. Rinse skin with water [or shower]. Get immediate medical advice/attention.
P304	IF INHALED:
P304+P312	(Obsolete) IF INHALED: Call a POISON CENTER or doctor/physician if you feel unwell.
P304+P317	(Obsolete) IF INHALED: Get medical help.
P304+P340	IF INHALED: Remove person to fresh air and keep comfortable for breathing.
P304+P340+P310	(Obsolete) IF INHALED: Remove victim to fresh air and keep at rest in a position comfortable for breathing. Immediately call a POISON CENTER or doctor/physician.
P304+P340+P311	(Obsolete) IF INHALED: Remove victim to fresh air and keep at rest in a position comfortable for breathing. Call a POISON CENTER or doctor/physician.
P304+P340+P312	(Obsolete) IF INHALED: Remove victim to fresh air and keep at rest in a position comfortable for breathing. Call a POISON CENTER or doctor/physician if you feel unwell.
P304+P340+P315	(Obsolete) IF INHALED: Remove victim to fresh air and keep at rest in a position comfortable for breathing. Get immediate medical advice/attention.
P304+P341	(Obsolete) IF INHALED: If breathing is difficult, remove victim to fresh air and keep at rest in a position comfortable for breathing.
P305	IF IN EYES:
P305+P351+P338	IF IN EYES: Rinse continuously with water for several minutes. Remove contact lenses, if present and easy to do. Continue rinsing.
P305+P351+P338+P310	(Obsolete) IF IN EYES: Rinse continuously with water for several minutes. Remove contact lenses, if present and easy to do. Continue rinsing. Immediately call a POISON CENTER or doctor/physician.
P305+P351+P338+P315	(Obsolete) IF IN EYES: Rinse cautiously with water for several minutes. Remove contact lenses, if present and easy to do. Continue rinsing. Get immediate medical advice/attention.
P305+P354+P338	IF IN EYES: Immediately rinse with water for several minutes. Remove contact lenses, if present and easy to do. Continue rinsing.
P306	IF ON CLOTHING:
P306+P360	IF ON CLOTHING: Rinse immediately contaminated clothing and skin with plenty of water before removing clothes.
P307	(Obsolete) IF exposed:
P307+P311	(Obsolete) IF exposed: Call a POISON CENTER or doctor/physician.
P308	IF exposed or concerned:
P308+P310	(Obsolete) IF exposed or concerned: Immediately call a POISON CENTER or doctor/physician.
P308+P311	(Obsolete) IF exposed or concerned: Call a POISON CENTER or doctor/physician.
P308+P313	(Obsolete) IF exposed or concerned: Get medical advice/attention.
P308+P316	IF exposed or concerned: Get emergency medical help immediately.
P309	(Obsolete) IF exposed or you feel unwell:
P309+P311	(Obsolete) IF exposed or you feel unwell: Call a POISON CENTER or doctor/physician.
P310	(Obsolete) Immediately call a POISON CENTER or doctor/physician.
P311	(Obsolete) Call a POISON CENTER or doctor/physician.
P312	(Obsolete) Call a POISON CENTER or doctor/physician if you feel unwell.
P313	(Obsolete) Get medical advice/attention.
P314	(Obsolete) Get Medical advice/attention if you feel unwell.
P315	(Obsolete) Get immediate medical advice/attention.
P316	Get emergency medical help immediately.
P317	Get medical help.
P318	If exposed or concerned, get medical advice.
P319	Get medical help if you feel unwell.
P320	Specific treatment is urgent (see information on this label and safety data sheet).
P321	Specific treatment (see information on this label and safety data sheet).
P322	Specific treatment is urgent (see information on the safety data sheet).
P323	Specific treatment (see information on the safety data sheet).
P330	Rinse mouth.
P331	Do NOT induce vomiting.
P332	If skin irritation occurs:
P332+P313	(Obsolete) If skin irritation occurs: Get medical advice/attention.
P332+P317	If skin irritation occurs: Get medical help.
P333	If skin irritation or a rash occurs:
P333+P313	(Obsolete) If skin irritation or a rash occurs: Get medical advice/attention.
P333+P317	If skin irritation or rash occurs: Get medical help.
P334	Immerse in cool water [or wrap in wet bandages].
P335	Brush off loose particles from skin.
P335+P334	(Obsolete) Brush off loose particles from skin. Immerse in cool water/wrap in wet bandages.
P336	Thaw frosted parts with lukewarm water. Do not rub affected areas.
P336+P315	(Obsolete) Thaw frosted parts with lukewarm water. Do not rub affected area. Get immediate medical advice/attention.
P336+P317	Immediately thaw frosted parts with lukewarm water. Do not rub affected area. Get medical help.
P337	If eye irritation persists:
P337+P313	(Obsolete) If eye irritation persists: Get medical advice/attention.
P337+P317	If eye irritation persists: Get medical help.
P338	Remove contact lenses if present and easy to do. Continue rinsing.
P340	Remove person to fresh air and keep comfortable for breathing.
P341	(Obsolete) If breathing is difficult, remove victim to fresh air and keep at rest in a position comfortable for breathing.
P342	If experiencing respiratory symptoms:
P342+P311	(Obsolete) If experiencing respiratory symptoms: Call a POISON CENTER or doctor/physician.
P342+P316	If experiencing respiratory symptoms: Get emergence medical help immediately.
P350	(Obsolete) Gently wash with soap and water.
P351	Rinse cautiously with water for several minutes.
P352	Wash with plenty of water/...
P353	Rinse skin with water [or shower].
P354	Immediately rinse with water for several minutes.
P360	Rinse immediately contaminated clothing and skin with plenty of water before removing clothes.
P361	Take off immediately all contaminated clothing.
P361+P364	Take off immediately all contaminated clothing and wash it before reuse.
P362	Take off contaminated clothing.
P362+P364	Take off contaminated clothing and wash it before reuse.
P363	Wash contaminated clothing before reuse.
P364	And wash it before reuse.
P370	In case of fire:
P370+P372+P380+P373	In case of fire: Explosion risk. Evacuate area. DO NOT fight fire when fire reaches explosives.
P370+P376	In case of fire: Stop leak if safe to do so.
P370+P378	In case of fire: Use ... to extinguish.
P370+P380	(Obsolete) In case of fire: Evacuate area.
P370+P380+P375	In case of fire: Evacuate area. Fight fire remotely due to the risk of explosion.
P370+P380+P375+P378	In case of fire: Evacuate area. Fight fire remotely due to the risk of explosion. Use...to extinguish.
P371	In case of major fire and large quantities:
P371+P380+P375	In case of major fire and large quantities: Evacuate area. Fight fire remotely due to the risk of explosion.
P372	Explosion risk.
P373	DO NOT fight fire when fire reaches explosives.
P374	(Obsolete) Fight fire with normal precautions from a reasonable distance.
P375	Fight fire remotely due to the risk of explosion.
P376	Stop leak if safe to do so.
P377	Leaking gas fire: Do not extinguish, unless leak can be stopped safely.
P378	Use ... to extinguish.
P380	Evacuate area.
P381	In case of leakage, eliminate all ignition sources.
P390	Absorb spillage to prevent material damage.
P391	Collect spillage.

== Storage precautionary statements ==
GHS P-phrases (19)
Code	Phrase
P401	Store in accordance with ...
P402	Store in a dry place.
P402+P404	Store in a dry place. Store in a closed container.
P403	Store in a well-ventilated place.
P403+P233	Store in a well-ventilated place. Keep container tightly closed.
P403+P235	Store in a well-ventilated place. Keep cool.
P404	Store in a closed container.
P405	Store locked up.
P406	Store in a corrosion resistant/... container with a resistant inner liner.
P407	Maintain air gap between stacks or pallets.
P410	Protect from sunlight.
P410+P403	Protect from sunlight. Store in a well-ventilated place.
P410+P412	Protect from sunlight. Do not expose to temperatures exceeding 50 ºC/122 ºF.
P411	Store at temperatures not exceeding ... ºC/... ºF.
P411+P235	(Obsolete) Store at temperatures not exceeding ... ºC/... ºF. Keep cool.
P412	Do not expose to temperatures exceeding 50 ºC/122 ºF.
P413	Store bulk masses greater than ... kg/... lbs at temperatures not exceeding ... °C/... °F.
P420	Store separately.
P422	(Obsolete) Store contents under ...

== Disposal precautionary statements ==
GHS P-phrases (3)
Code	Phrase
P501	Dispose of contents/container to ...
P502	Refer to manufacturer or supplier for information on recovery or recycling.
P503	Refer to manufacturer/supplier... for information on disposal/recovery/recycling.
