= Jeyes Fluid =

Brand of disinfectant fluid

- Founder: John Jeyes, Cambridge, England
- Products: Disinfectant
- Website: www.jeyesfluid.co.uk

Jeyes Fluid /ˈdʒeɪz/ is a brand of disinfectant fluid for external use only, owned by the Easy Cleaning Solutions LTD It is predominantly used for removing bacteria, while gardeners have found it effective at cleaning paths, patios, greenhouses, driveways and drains; particularly of moss. With cautious use, it can also remove weeds.

The product was patented by John Jeyes in 1877, and granted a Royal Warrant to the British royal family in 1896.

While no longer used for this purpose, Jeyes Fluid has been used in historical medical treatments. William Robert Woodman attributes low death rates for cases of scarlet fever to interventions, including

"...that patients are given frequent warm baths, beginning at the end of the first week. Warm baths with some Jeyes' fluid in them are used, the latter preventing the spread of the infection."

The first television ad for Jeyes Fluid was not until 2011, when a £500,000 advertising campaign was aired in the UK over the Easter bank holiday.

== Composition ==
=== Current ===
D-Glucopyranose, oligomeric, decyl octyl glycosides: >= 1- < 5 %

C12-16 Alkyldimethylbenzylammonium chloride: >= 1- < 2.4 %

Formic acid: >= 1- < 5 %

Lactic acid: >= 1- < 3 %

=== Former ===
Name	EC №	CAS №	Concentration by weight	Risk statements
p-chloro-m-cresol (p-chlorocresol)	200-431-6	59-50-7	5–10%	Xn;R21/22 R43 Xi;R41 N;R50
(Poly-)alkylphenols	284-893-4	84989-05-9	5–10%	T;R24/25. Xi;R38
Propan-2-ol (isopropyl alcohol)	200-661-7	67-63-0	1–2.5%	F;R11 Xi;R36 R67
Terpineol (for fragrance)	232-268-1	8000-41-7	2.5–5%	Xi;R38

It has a pH between 8.0 and 10.0 (moderately alkaline).
