= Risk and Safety Statements =

System of hazard codes and phrases for labeling dangerous chemicals and compounds

Risk and Safety Statements, also known as R/S statements, R/S numbers, R/S phrases, and R/S sentences, is a system of hazard codes and phrases for labeling dangerous chemicals and compounds. The R/S statement of a compound consists of a risk part (R) and a safety part (S), each followed by a combination of numbers. Each number corresponds to a phrase. The phrase corresponding to the letter/number combination has the same meaning in different languages—see 'languages' in the menu on the left.

In 2015, the risk and safety statements were replaced by hazard statements and precautionary statements in the course of harmonising classification, labelling and packaging of chemicals by introduction of the UN Globally Harmonized System of Classification and Labelling of Chemicals (GHS).

== Example ==
The R/S statement code for fuming hydrochloric acid (37%):

R: 34-37 S: 26-36-45.

The corresponding English language phrases:

Risks

R: 34 Causes burns
R: 37 Irritating to the respiratory system.

Safety

S: 26 In case of contact with eyes, rinse immediately with plenty of water and seek medical advice.
S: 36 Wear suitable protective clothing.
S: 45 In case of accident or if you feel unwell, seek medical advice immediately (show label where possible).

Dashes separate the phrase numbers. They are not to be confused with range indicators.

Example: R: 34-37 Causes burns, irritating to the respiratory system.

Slashes indicate fixed combinations of single phrases.

Example: R: 36/37/38 Irritating to eyes, respiratory system and skin.

More detailed hazard and safety information can be found in the material safety data sheets (MSDS) of a compound.

== See also ==
- Safety data sheet
- List of R-phrases
- List of S-phrases
