= Workplace Hazardous Materials Information System =

Canadian national hazard communication standard

WHMIS logo

The Workplace Hazardous Materials Information System (WHMIS; French: Système d'information sur les matières dangereuses utilisées au travail, SIMDUT) is Canada's national workplace hazard communication standard. The key elements of the system, which came into effect on October 31, 1988, are cautionary labelling of containers of WHMIS controlled products, the provision of material safety data sheets (MSDSs) and worker education and site-specific training programs.

WHMIS is an example of synchronization and cooperation amongst Canada's federal, provincial and territorial governments. The coordinated approach avoided duplication, inefficiency through loss of scale and the interprovincial trade barriers that would have been created had each province and territory established its own hazard communication system.

== Legislative framework ==
The federal Hazardous Products Act and associated Controlled Products Regulations, administered by the Workplace Hazardous Materials Bureau residing in the federal Department of Health Canada, established the national standard for chemical classification and hazard communication in Canada and is the foundation for the workers' "right-to-know" legislation enacted in each of Canada's provinces and territories.

Under the Constitution of Canada, labour legislation falls primarily under the jurisdiction of Canada's provinces and territories. The Labour Program, of the federal government Department of Human Resources and Skills Development Canada, is the occupational health and safety (OHS) regulatory authority for the approximately 10% of workplaces designated to be under federal jurisdiction. As such, each of the thirteen federal, provincial and territorial (FPT) agencies responsible for OHS has established employer WHMIS requirements within their respective jurisdiction. These requirements place an onus on employers to ensure that controlled products used, stored or handled in the workplace are properly labelled, that material safety data sheets are made available to workers, and that workers receive education and site-specific training to ensure the safe storage, handling and use of controlled products in the workplace.

The development of WHMIS 1988 was a collaborative effort, involving industry, organized labour and governments as part of an advisory body to develop the system. The system divides responsibility among the various levels of a product, with suppliers, employers and workers each having a role in WHMIS. Suppliers who distribute hazardous products must ensure that containers are properly marked, and that SDS documentation is accurate and provided to customers. Employers are responsible for the training of their workers on the safe usage of hazardous products and any risks they pose, providing safe storage and labeled containers, and must ensure availability of SDS documentation to workers. Workers are expected to take part in WHMIS trainings, follow training and instructions on the safe usage of hazardous materials, and report issues such as damaged or missing container labels. Even after the move from WHMIS 1988 to WHMIS 2015, this structure of shared responsibility is retained and largely unchanged.

== WHMIS 2015 ==
On February 11, 2015, the Government of Canada published in the Canada Gazette a new modified version of the WHMIS system called WHMIS 2015. WHMIS 2015 was created "to incorporate the Globally Harmonized System of Classification and Labelling of Chemicals (GHS) for workplace chemicals." A notable difference in the WHMIS adoption of GHS was the inclusion of a 'biohazard' hazard pictogram, retained from the original WHMIS 1988 pictograms. The standard GHS pictograms do not include a specific symbol for biohazards.

=== Transition Period ===
WHMIS 2015 was phased into use over a three year period from February 2015 to December 2018. By 1 December 2018, use of WHMIS 2015 was mandatory by manufacturers/importers, distributors and employers.

Transition timeline
Phase	Dates	Suppliers		Employer
Phase	Dates	Manufactures and Importers	Distributors	Employer
1	11 February 2015 - 31 May 2018	WHMIS 1988 or WHMIS 2015	WHMIS 1988 or WHMIS 2015	Varied (Note: Determined by authorities at the local, territory and federal level.)
2	1 June 2018 - 31 August, 2018	WHMIS 2015	WHMIS 1988 or WHMIS 2015	WHMIS 1988 or WHMIS 2015
3	1 September, 2018 - 30 November, 2018	WHMIS 2015	WHMIS 2015	WHMIS 1988 or WHMIS 2015
Completion	1 December, 2018	WHMIS 2015		

=== Materials covered ===
WHMIS 2015 regulations cover materials, referred to as a 'hazardous products' used in a workplace, that meets the criteria of hazard classification, such as toxicity, flash point. These are classified as 'hazardous product':

- Aerosols
- Oxidizing liquids, solids and Gases
- Gases Under Pressure
- Flammable Liquids, solids and gases
- Self-reactive substances/mixtures
- Pyrophoric liquids and solids
- Self-heating substances/mixtures
- Water-reactive substances/mixtures
- Organic peroxides
- Corrosives
- Combustible dusts
- Toxic
- Skin corrosion/irritant
- Eye irritant
- Respiratory hazard
- Carcinogenic
- Specific Target Organ toxicity
- Aspiration hazard
- Biohazard

The following were exempt from WHMIS, and are in most cases subject to legislation specific to the material:

- Consumer products (Note: Products that are sold to the public for non-commercial uses. These are regulated by Consumer Chemicals and Containers Regulations.)
- Cosmetic, drug or foodstuff (Note: Defined in the Food and Drugs Act)
- Explosives (Note: Defined in the Explosives Act)
- Hazardous waste
- Radioactive substances (Note: Defined in Nuclear Safety and Control Act)
- Manufactured materials
- Pest control products (Note: Defined in the Pest Control Products Act)
- Tobacco products (Note: Defined in the Tobacco Act)
- Wood and products made of wood

== WHMIS 1988 ==
The original WHMIS went into effect 31 October 1988, as part of a series of legislations at both the federal and provisional and territory levels. WHMIS 1988 was phased out from 2015 to 2018, with the old system being completely phased out on 1 December, 2018.

All substances that WHMIS applied, 'controlled products', fell into one of the six general WHMIS classes:

- Compressed gases (Class A)
- Flammable/combustible materials (Class B)
- Oxidizing materials (Class C)
- Poisonous and biohazards (Class D)
- Corrosives (Class E)
- Reactive substances (Class F)

The 1988 system included eight symbols, one per classification, except for Class D, which had three symbols, one for each division of the class.

WHMIS 1988 Symbols

Class A: Compressed gas

Class B: Flammable and combustible material

Class C: Oxidizing material

Class D-1: Materials causing immediate and serious toxic effects

Class D-2: Materials causing other toxic effects

Class D-3: Biohazardous infectious material

Class E:Corrosive material

Class F: Dangerously reactive material

== See also ==
- Hazard symbol
- Hazard Communication Standard
