= Reproductive toxicity =

Hazard associated with chemical substances

The international pictogram for chemicals that are sensitising, mutagenic, carcinogenic or toxic to reproduction

Reproductive toxicity refers to the potential risk from a given chemical, physical or biologic agent to adversely affect both male and female fertility as well as offspring development. Reproductive toxicants may adversely affect sexual function, ovarian failure, fertility as well as causing developmental toxicity in the offspring. Lowered effective fertility related to reproductive toxicity relates to both male and female effects alike and is reflected in decreased sperm counts, semen quality and ovarian failure.

== Infertility ==
Infertility is medically defined as a failure of a couple to conceive over the course of one year of unprotected intercourse. Primary infertility indicates that a person has never been able to achieve pregnancy while secondary infertility is defined as a person having at least one pregnancy before. As many as 20% of couples experience infertility. Infertility may be caused by an issue along any part of the process of fertilizing an egg through birth of the child. This can include: the release of the egg, the ability of the sperm to fertilize the egg, the implantation of the egg in the uterine wall, and the ability of the fetus to complete development without miscarriage. Among males oligospermia is defined as a paucity of viable spermatozoa in the semen, whereas azoospermia refers to the complete absence of viable spermatozoa in the semen. Males may also experience issues in sperm motility and morphology, which means the sperm are less likely to make it to the egg or to be able to fertilize the egg. Female infertility could be a result of an issue regarding their uterus, ovaries, or fallopian tubes and can be affected by various diseases, endocrine/hormone disruption, or reproductive toxicant.

The Globally Harmonized System of Classification and Labelling of Chemicals (GHS) separates reproductive toxicity from germ cell mutagenicity and carcinogenicity, even though both these hazards may also affect fertility.

== Effects ==
Many drugs can affect the human reproductive system. Their effects can be

- desired (hormonal contraception),
- a minor unwanted side effect (many antidepressants) or
- a major public health problem (thalidomide).

However, most studies of reproductive toxicity have focused on occupational or environmental exposure to chemicals and their effects on reproduction. Both consumption of alcohol and tobacco smoking are known to be "toxic for reproduction" in the sense used here.

One well-known group of substances which are toxic for reproduction are teratogens – substances which cause birth defects. (S)-thalidomide is possibly the most notorious of these.

Another group of substances which have received much attention (and prompted some controversy) as possibly toxic for reproduction are the so-called endocrine disruptors. Endocrine disruptors change how hormones are produced and how they interact with their receptors. Endocrine disruptors are classified as estrogenic, anti-estrogenic, androgenic or anti-androgenic. Each category includes pharmaceutical compounds and environmental compounds. Estrogenic or androgenic compounds will cause the same hormonal responses as the sex steroids (estrogen and testosterone). However anti-estrogenic and anti-andogenic compounds bind to a receptor and block the hormones from binding to their receptors, thus preventing their function. A few examples of the many types of endocrine disruptors are trenbolone (androgenic), flutamide (anti-androgenic), diethylstilbestrol (estrogenic), bisphenol A (estrogenic) and tributyltin (anti-estrogenic).

However, many substances which are toxic for reproduction do not fall into any of these groups: lead compounds, for example, are considered to be toxic for reproduction given their adverse effects on the normal intellectual and psychomotor development of human babies and children.

== Examples ==
=== Heavy metals ===
==== Lead ====
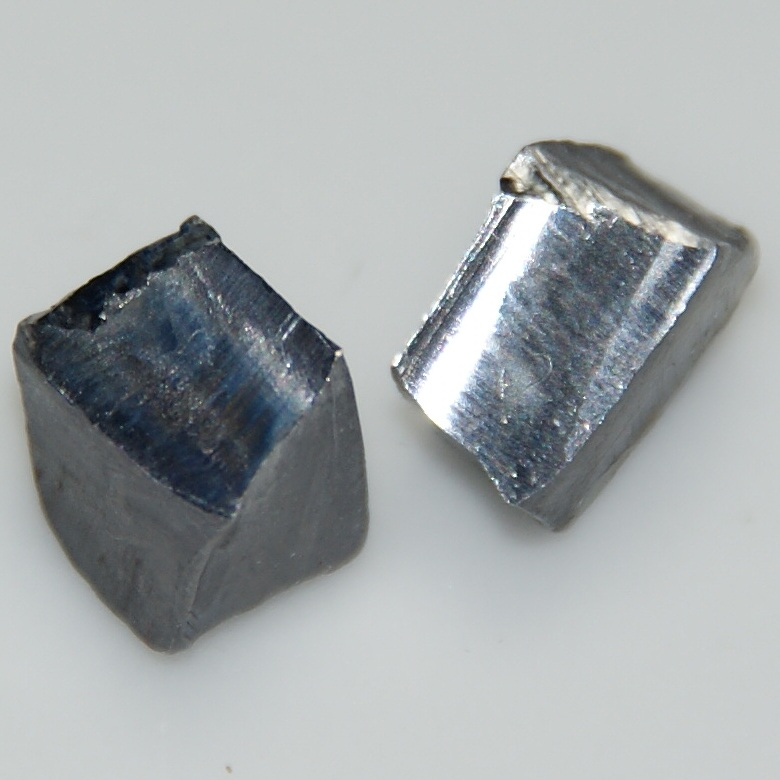
Elemental lead

Lead, a heavy metal that can exist in both organic and inorganic forms, and is associated with adverse effects on male libido, erectile disfunction, premature ejaculation and poor sperm quality. Lead is also associated with negative effects on the female reproductive system particularly for pregnant women. Elevated blood lead levels can increase risk of preeclampsia and miscarriage and can lead to birth defects. Lead is believed to predominantly affect male reproduction by the disruption of hormones, which reduces the quantity of sperm production in the seminiferous tubules. It has also been proposed that lead causes poor semen quality by promoting the generation of reactive oxygen species such as hydrogen peroxide due to lipid peroxidation, which can cause cellular damage. Lead can be found in contaminated soil, water, as well as manufactured goods like jewelry, toys, and paint. Common routes of exposure are inhalation and digestion, though dermal exposure can occur albeit less frequently. Occupational exposures remain a high risk, particularly for industries such as battery/electronic recycling, construction, mining, smelting, and welders or any other industry which interacts with lead. Families and cohabitants of the above workers may be at risk of take-home exposure and may need to take precautions to avoid reproductive effects.

==== Cadmium ====
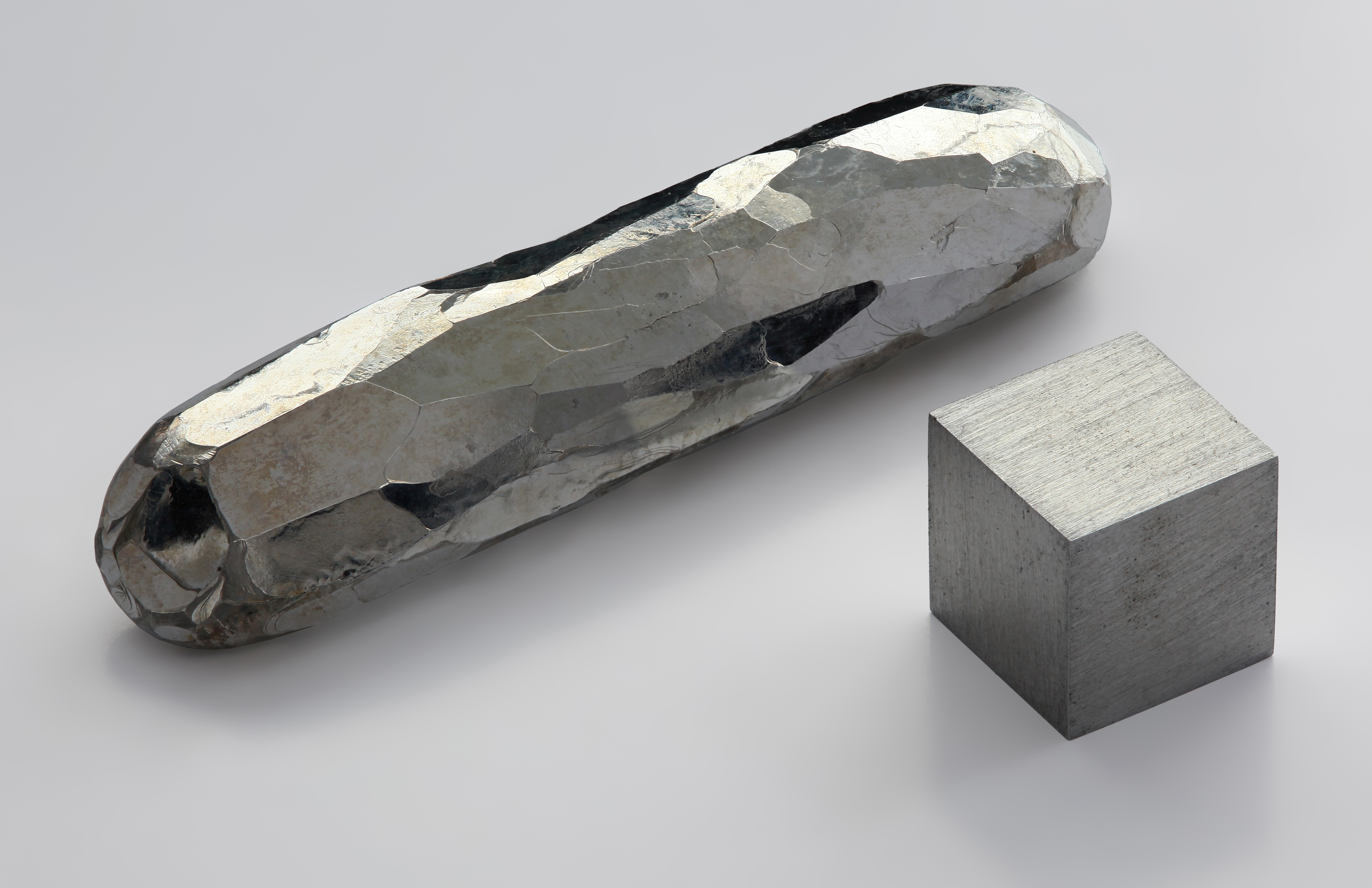
Elemental cadmium.

Cadmium is a heavy metal used in jewelry making, electronics, welding and galvanizing steel. The human route of exposure is primarily inhalational or oral; environmental exposure among the non-occupationally exposed can occur due to exposure to cigarette smoking. The oral route of exposure can occur due to ingesting plants and shellfish that have taken up cadmium from water and soil. Exposure to cadmium results in adverse male fertility in terms of decreased spermatogenesis, semen quality, sperm motility and impaired hormonal synthesis. Likewise, exposure to cadmium impairs female fertility in terms of menstrual cycle regularity and reproductive hormonal balance. Cadmium exposure can negatively affect fetal development throughout the gestation as well as ovulation and implantation.

==== Chromium ====
Hexavalent chromium ( Cr VI) is used in the electronics industry and for metal plating. Chromium exposure is primarily inhalation or through ingestion. Human and animal studies show that exposure to hexavalent chromium decreases semen quality and sperm counts.

==== Mercury ====
Elemental mercury( Hg^{0}) is a metal that exists as liquid form at room temperature and is commonly found in thermometers, blood pressure cuffs and dental amalgams. In terms of exposure, the route of absorption is primarily via inhalation through mercury vapor, which can in turn lead to mercury poisoning. Occupational exposure to inorganic mercury can occur in industries such as dentistry, fluorescent lamp production, and Chloralkali workers. Data among female dental technicians exposed to mercury vapors have demonstrated decreased fertility among those who were exposed and practiced poor industrial hygiene while handling dental amalgams. Elemental and organic mercury can cross the blood brain barrier, like many other heavy metals, making it particularly significant for pregnant women as it can affect fetal development and birth outcomes. Among female workers in mercury smelting plants an increase in spontaneous abortions has been reported.

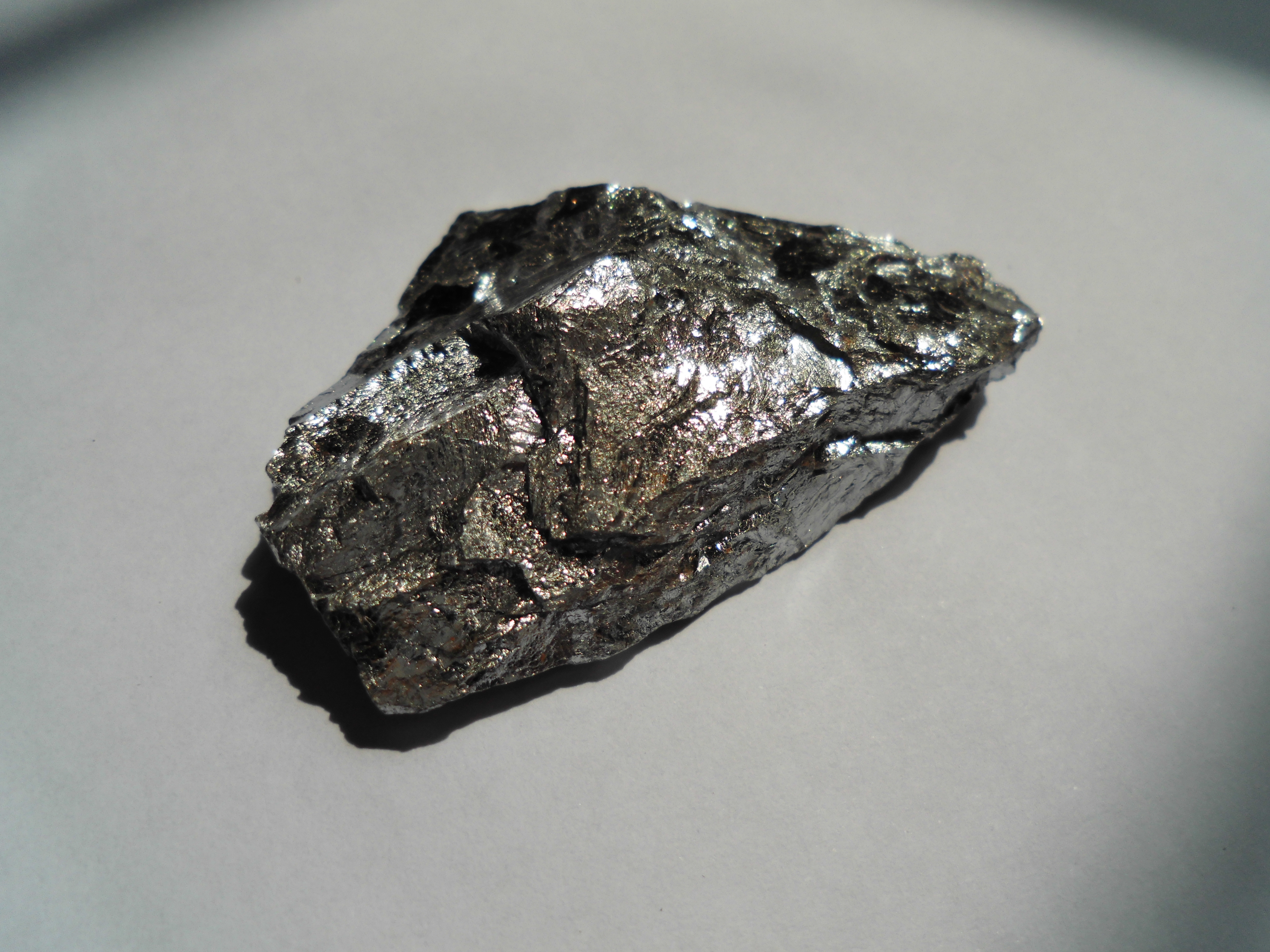
Elemental chromium.

=== Dibromochloropropane ===
Dibromochloropropane (DBCP) is used as a pesticide against nematodes in the agricultural industry. DBCP is one of the most well-known reproductive toxicants known to cause testicular toxicity. Workers in chemical factories exposed to dibromochloropropane have been shown to develop dose-dependent oligospermia and azoospermia. Additional studies also demonstrated that DBCP-exposed workers in banana and pineapple plantations in Central America and other countries also developed oligospermia and azoospermia. In 1977, the United States Environmental Protection Agency banned the use of DBCP in agriculture due to its effect on male fertility. Despite being banned from use in agriculture, DBCP is still used as an intermediate in chemical manufacturing as well as a reagent in research.

Ethylene dibromide

Ethylene dibromide (EDB) is a fumigant that was originally used to protect citrus fruits, grains and vegetables from insects. Use of EDB in the United States was banned by the United States Environmental Protection Agency in 1984, however EDB is still used in the United States as fumigant to treat timber logs for beetles and termites. Likewise, it is still used as an intermediate in chemical manufacturing. Exposure to EDB has been shown to adversely affect male fertility by leading to a decreased sperm counts, decreased numbers of viable sperm and increased abnormal sperm morphology. The primary route of exposure is through inhalation.

==== Industrial solvents ====
Solvent exposure is common among men and women working in industrial settings. Specific solvents including xylene, perchloroethylene, toluene and methylene chloride have been shown to be associated with a concurrent elevation in risk for spontaneous abortion

=== Ionizing radiation ===
Ionizing radiation in the form alpha, beta and gamma emissions are well known to adversely affect male and female fertility, as well as fetal development. Exposure to low doses of ionizing radiation can occur naturally in the environment or due to medical treatment or diagnosis, however, higher exposures may be associated with occupation. Occupations with documented risk include: healthcare workers who interact with radioactive material, certain manufacturing processes, and airline personnel. Exposure in the range of 0.1 to1.2 Gy is associated with spermatogonial injury; whereas between 4-6 Gy reductions of sperm counts have been reported. Ionizing radiation is considered a hazard particularly in pregnancy, due to its potential effect of gestational development. More specifically, ionizing radiation is associated with an increased risk of miscarriage and stillbirth. Recent studies suggest that routine medical examinations that expose a pregnant person to ionizing radiation are not associated with an increase of risk of miscarriage or stillbirth.

=== Radio frequency electromagnetic fields ===
Radio frequency electromagnetic fields, such as those generated from mobile phone devices, have been shown to decrease semen quality production in experimental animal models; however human data is still equivocal at best. The International Association for the Research of Cancer(IARC) classifies radio frequency electromagnetic fields as a group 2B or possibly carcinogenic.

=== Endocrine disrupting compounds ===
Lipid soluble compounds that can cross the cell lipid bilayer and bind cytoplasmic steroid hormone receptors can translocate to the nucleus and act as estrogen agonists. Diethylstilbestrol (DES), a synthetic estrogen, is one such endocrine disruptor and acts as an estrogen agonist. Diethylstilbestrol was used from 1938 to 1971 to prevent spontaneous abortions. Diethylstilbestrol causes cancer and mutations by producing highly reactive metabolites, also causing DNA adducts to form. Exposure to diethylstilbestrol in the womb can cause atypical reproductive tract formation. Specifically, females exposed to diethylstilbestrol in utero during the first trimester have are more likely to develop clear cell vaginal carcinoma, and males have an increased risk of hypospadias.

=== Bisphenol A ===
The chemical structure of bisphenol A.

Bisphenol A (BPA) is used in polycarbonate plastic consumer goods and aluminum can liners. BPA is an example of an endocrine disruptor which negatively affects reproductive development by acting as an estrogen mimicker (xenoestrogen) and a likely androgen mimicker. Bisphenol A exposure in fetal female rats leads to mammary gland morphogenesis, increased formation of ovarian tumors, and increased risk of developing mammary gland neoplasia in adult life. In lab animal models, BPA is considered to be both an ovarian and uterine toxicant as it impairs endometrial proliferation, decreases uterine receptivity and decreases the chances for successful implantation of the embryo The adverse reproductive toxicological effects of bisphenol A have been better studied in females than in males.

=== Antineoplastic Drugs (Chemotherapy) ===
Antineoplastic drugs, commonly known as chemotherapy drugs, are considered hazardous drugs by the CDC, including hazardous to reproductive health. Exposure to chemotherapy drugs most often occurs through treatment for cancer, however, unintentional occupational exposure may occur in for workers involved in pharmaceutical production, pharmacists or technicians preparing the drugs, and nurses or other healthcare professionals who are administering medication to patients. Other hospital staff, particularly custodial workers, who interact or handle antineoplastic drugs in any capacity may also be at risk of exposure. Exposure can occur through inhalation, skin contact, ingestion, or injection.

=== Non-Chemical Toxicants ===
==== Work Schedule ====
Work schedule can become a reproductive toxicant when working hours are during the employee's typical sleeping hours (night shift), when a worker has an irregular work schedule (shift work) or long working hours. Work schedule's reproductive toxicity is primarily a result of effect on regularity, quality, and rhythm of sleep. Shift work is associated with menstrual disorders, which can in turn affect fertility. Irregular work schedule, working long hours, and working the night shift is associated with an increased risk of miscarriage and pre-term birth. Many occupations engage in shift work, including requiring rotating work schedules, long hours, or night shift work. Some occupations that frequently engage in shift work include first responders, airline personnel, healthcare workers, and service workers. The CDC estimates that fifteen-million Americans engage in shift work and 30% get less than six-hours of sleep.

==== Physical Demands ====
Physical demands can include bending, lifting, and standing. Physical demands are considered a reproductive toxicant as they can increase the risk of adverse outcomes during pregnancy. Bending, lifting, and standing are often associated with occupational responsibilities as the risk is minimal unless physical activity is prolonged. Standing and walking for more than three hours a day is associated with an increased risk of pre-term birth, while standing for six to eight hours a day is associated with an increased risk of miscarriage. The weight and frequency of lifting is also associated with increased risk of miscarriage and preterm birth, with estimates of loads over 10 kg, or frequency a cumulative 100 kg/day.

==== Noise ====
Noise is considered a reproductive toxicant due to its potential effect on fetal development during pregnancy. While pregnant women may be able to use proper hearing protection to conserve their own hearing, after the 20th week of development babies' ears are susceptible to hearing loss. Pregnant women who are past 20 weeks of development should consider avoiding noises above 85 decibels, including at work and recreational activities.

== See also ==
- Developmental toxicity
- CLP regulation
- Lead toxicity
- Mercury poisoning
