= Dangerous Preparations Directive =

Directive 1999/45/EC
- European Union directive
- Text with EEA relevance
- Title: Directive concerning the approximation of the laws, regulations and administrative provisions of the Member States relating to the classification, packaging and labelling of dangerous preparations
- Made by: European Parliament and Council
- Made under: Art. 95 (EC)
- Journal reference: L200, 30 July 1999, pp. 1–68
- EEA Joint Committee decision: No 59/2004 of 26 April 2004

History
- Date made: 31 May 1999
- Entry into force: 30 July 1999
- Implementation date: 30 July 2002

Preparative texts
- Commission proposal: COM 96/0347 Final, C283, 26 September 1996, p. 1 COM 97/0462 Final, C337, 7 November 1997, p. 45
- EESC opinion: C158, 26 May 1997, p. 76
- EP opinion: C222, 21 July 1997, p. 26; C150, 28 May 1999

Other legislation
- Replaces: Dir. 78/631/EEC; Dir. 88/379/EEC; Dir. 90/35/EEC; Dir. 91/442/EEC
- Amended by: Dir. 2001/60/EC; Reg. (EC) No 1882/2003; Dir. 2004/66; Dir. 2006/8; Dir. 2006/96; Reg. (EC) No 1907/2006; Reg. (EC) No 1137/2008
- Replaced by: Reg. (EC) No 1272/2008 (from 1 June 2015)

The Dangerous Preparations Directive was a European Union directive in the field of occupational safety and health and consumer protection that came into force on 30 July 1999. It complemented the Dangerous Substances Directive (67/548/EEC) and replaced a previous Dangerous Preparations Directive (88/379/EEC). The European Court of Justice had ruled in 1985 that Dangerous Substances Directive (67/548/EEC) applies only to pure substances, not preparations (mixtures of substances). It was repealed on 1 June 2015, as part of the European Union's adoption of Globally Harmonized System of Classification and Labelling of Chemicals, as part of CLP Regulation.
