= James Jeyes =

English footballer

Personal information
- Full name: Arthur James Jeyes
- Date of birth: 1890
- Place of birth: Stepney, England
- Position: Left half

Senior career*
| Years | Team | Apps | (Gls) |
| –1915 | Clapton Orient | 1 | (0) |
- * Club domestic league appearances and goals

Arthur James Jeyes was an English football left half who made one appearance in the Football League for Clapton Orient.

== Personal life ==
Jeyes served as a gunner in the British Army during the First World War.

== Career statistics ==
Appearances and goals by club, season and competition
| Club | Season | League | | | FA Cup | | Total | |
| Club | Season | Division | Apps | Goals | Apps | Goals | Apps | Goals |
|---|---|---|---|---|---|---|---|---|
| Clapton Orient | 1914–15 | Second Division | 1 | 0 | 0 | 0 | 1 | 0 |
| Career total | | | 1 | 0 | 0 | 0 | 1 | 0 |
