= John Jeyes =

- Born: Wootton
- Baptised: 10 June 1817
- Died: 12 January 1892 (aged 75); Forest Gate
- Burial place: East London Cemetery
- Occupation: Manufacturing chemist
- Known for: Jeyes Fluid
- Spouse: Sarah Frances Weldon
- Children: Ten: four girls and six boys

John Jeyes (1817–1892) was a chemical manufacturer, most famous for a disinfectant liquid, Jeyes Fluid. His name is also given to an award for chemistry in relation to the environment which is awarded every two years by the Royal Society of Chemistry.

John Jeyes was born in Wootton, Northamptonshire, the second son of Philadelphus Jeyes (1780–1828), a retail pharmacist, and Elizabeth, née Ward, daughter of a local landowner, and baptised on 10 June 1817.

Jeyes’s first venture into business came when he, his elder brother, also Philadelphus, and James Atkins, a local nurseryman, went into partnership in the early 1840s. It is not known how long this lasted but twenty years later Jeyes, by then married with six children, moved to London; in 1863 he was living in Finsbury. The 1871 census shows that he was now a manufacturing chemist, living at 100 Balaam Street, Plaistow. That year he set up the Jeyesine Oil and Paint Company Ltd., but it failed two years later.

Jeyes patented his disinfectant liquid in 1877. The product was made in a factory in the grounds of his home, Richmond House, in Plaistow. He and his son Walter also established Jeyes' Sanitary Compounds Company Ltd in 1879, but the firm went into voluntary liquidation in 1884; its assets were sold the following year to a successor company of the same name.

== Family ==
On 10 March 1846, John Jeyes married Sarah Frances Weldon at St Mary's Church, Stamford; they had ten children.

Jeyes died at his home, 5 Windsor Road, Forest Gate on 12 January 1892. He was buried in the same grave as his wife in the East London Cemetery.

== John Jeyes Award ==
The John Jeyes Award was founded in 1975 and is awarded every two years for chemistry in relation to the environment. The award was previously named the John Jeyes lectureship and was first awarded to Ralph Louis Wain in 1976. Nominated by members of the Royal Society of Chemistry, the winner is chosen by the Environment, Sustainability and Energy Division Awards committee and receives £2000, a medal and a certificate. They also complete a UK lecture tour.
