= CLP Regulation =

2008 European Union regulation about chemicals

Regulation (EC) No 1272/2008
- European Union regulation
- Text with EEA relevance
- Title: Regulation on classification, labelling and packaging of substances and mixtures, amending and repealing Directives 67/548/EEC and 1999/45/EC, and amending Regulation (EC) No 1907/2006
- Made by: European Parliament and Council
- Made under: Art. 95 (EC)
- Journal reference: L353, 31.12.2008, pp. 1–1355

History
- Date made: 16 December 2008
- Entry into force: 20 January 2009

Preparative texts
- Commission proposal: COM (2007) 355 final, C191, 17.8.2008, p. 9
- EESC opinion: C204, 9.8.2008, pp. 47–56
- EP opinion: 3 September 2008

Other legislation
- Replaces: Dir. 67/548/EEC; Dir. 1999/45/EC
- Amends: Reg. (EC) No 1907/2006

The CLP Regulation (for "Classification, Labelling and Packaging") is a European Union regulation from 2008, which aligns the European Union system of classification, labelling and packaging of chemical substances and mixtures to the Globally Harmonised System (GHS). It is expected to facilitate global trade and the harmonised communication of hazard information of chemicals and to promote regulatory efficiency. It complements the 2006 Registration, Evaluation, Authorisation and Restriction of Chemicals (REACH) Regulation (EC No 1907/2006) and replaces an older system contained in the Dangerous Substances Directive (67/548/EEC) and the Dangerous Preparations Directive (1999/45/EC).

== Content ==
The European Union's 2008 Classification, Labelling and Packaging Regulation incorporates the classification criteria and labelling rules agreed at the UN level, the so-called Globally Harmonised System of Classification and Labelling of Chemicals (GHS). It introduced new classification criteria, European hazard symbols (pictograms) and Risk and Safety Statements for labelling, while taking into account elements which were part of the prior EU legislation.

The regulation requires companies to appropriately classify, label and package their substances and mixtures before placing them on the market. It aims to protect workers, consumers and the environment by labelling that reflects a particular chemical's possible hazards. It also addresses the notification of classifications, the establishment of a list of harmonised classifications and the creation of a classification and labelling inventory, as required by REACH.

=== Harmonised classification and labelling ===
Classification and labelling is harmonised to ensure an adequate risk management for hazards of highest concern (carcinogenicity, mutagenicity, reproductive toxicity (CMR) and respiratory sensitisers) and for other substances on a case-by-case basis. This is done through the so-called harmonised classification and labelling (CLH). Substances having CLH are listed in Annex VI to the CLP Regulation. Manufacturers, importers and downstream users of such substances and of mixtures containing such substances have to apply the CLH.

=== Unique formula identifier ===
The unique formula identifier (UFI, 16-digit code) will appear on product labels as a new identification element from 2020. By 2025, the UFI will become mandatory on the label of all products classified for health or physical hazards. Importers and downstream users placing such products on the market must provide specific product information, including the UFI, to poison centres.

== Implementation ==
The regulation came into force in January 2009. Manufacturers and importers had already pre-registered more than 140,000 substances with the European Chemicals Agency under the REACH Regulation. They had until 1 December 2010 to propose "provisional classifications" for these substances, which have been used for the labelling of pure substances since that date. The deadline for classifying mixtures was 31 May 2015. The deadline for re-labelling and re-packaging of products already on the market was two years later: 1 June 2017.

== Further legislation 2008–2009 ==
In 2008, Directive 2008/112/EC and regulation (EC) No 1336/2008 adapted classification-based provisions in other existing EU legislation (“downstream legislation”) to the new rules. Pursuant to article 53 of the CLP Regulation, in 2009 a first adaptation to the technical and scientific progress (ATP) was made with Commission Regulation 790/2009.

== See also ==
- European hazard symbols
