= Safety data sheet =

Sheet listing work-related hazards of a product or substance

An example SDS, including guidance for handling a hazardous substance and information on its composition and properties

A safety data sheet (SDS), material safety data sheet (MSDS), or product safety data sheet (PSDS) is a document that lists information relating to occupational safety and health for the use of various substances and products. SDSs are a widely used type of fact sheet used to catalogue information on chemical species including chemical compounds and chemical mixtures. SDS information may include instructions for the safe use and potential hazards associated with a particular material or product, along with spill-handling procedures. The older MSDS formats could vary from source to source within a country depending on national requirements; however, the newer SDS format is internationally standardized.

An SDS for a substance is not primarily intended for use by the general consumer, focusing instead on the hazards of working with the material in an occupational setting. There is also a duty to properly label substances on the basis of physico-chemical, health, or environmental risk. Labels often include hazard symbols such as the European Union standard symbols. The same product (e.g. paint sold under identical brand names by the same company) can have different formulations in different countries. The formulation and hazards of a product using a generic name may vary between manufacturers in the same country.

== Globally Harmonized System ==
The Globally Harmonized System of Classification and Labelling of Chemicals contains a standard specification for safety data sheets. The SDS follows a 16 section format which is internationally agreed and for substances especially, the SDS should be followed with an Annex which contains the exposure scenarios of this particular substance. The 16 sections are:

- SECTION 1: Identification of the substance/mixture and of the company/undertaking
  - 1.1. Product identifier
  - 1.2. Relevant identified uses of the substance or mixture and uses advised against
  - 1.3. Details of the supplier of the safety data sheet
  - 1.4. Emergency telephone number
- SECTION 2: Hazards identification
  - 2.1. Classification of the substance or mixture
  - 2.2. Label elements
  - 2.3. Other hazards
- SECTION 3: Composition/information on ingredients
  - 3.1. Substances
  - 3.2. Mixtures
- SECTION 4: First aid measures
  - 4.1. Description of first aid measures
  - 4.2. Most important symptoms and effects, both acute and delayed
  - 4.3. Indication of any immediate medical attention and special treatment needed
- SECTION 5: Firefighting measures
  - 5.1. Extinguishing media
  - 5.2. Special hazards arising from the substance or mixture
  - 5.3. Advice for firefighters
- SECTION 6: Accidental release measure
  - 6.1. Personal precautions, protective equipment and emergency procedures
  - 6.2. Environmental precautions
  - 6.3. Methods and material for containment and cleaning up
  - 6.4. Reference to other sections
- SECTION 7: Handling and storage
  - 7.1. Precautions for safe handling
  - 7.2. Conditions for safe storage, including any incompatibilities
  - 7.3. Specific end use(s)
- SECTION 8: Exposure controls/personal protection
  - 8.1. Control parameters
  - 8.2. Exposure controls
- SECTION 9: Physical and chemical properties
  - 9.1. Information on basic physical and chemical properties
  - 9.2. Other information
- SECTION 10: Stability and reactivity
  - 10.1. Reactivity
  - 10.2. Chemical stability
  - 10.3. Possibility of hazardous reactions
  - 10.4. Conditions to avoid
  - 10.5. Incompatible materials
  - 10.6. Hazardous decomposition products
- SECTION 11: Toxicological information
  - 11.1. Information on toxicological effects
- SECTION 12: Ecological information
  - 12.1. Toxicity
  - 12.2. Persistence and degradability
  - 12.3. Bioaccumulative potential
  - 12.4. Mobility in soil
  - 12.5. Results of PBT and vPvB assessment
  - 12.6. Other adverse effects
- SECTION 13: Disposal considerations
  - 13.1. Waste treatment methods
- SECTION 14: Transport information
  - 14.1. UN number
  - 14.2. UN proper shipping name
  - 14.3. Transport hazard class(es)
  - 14.4. Packing group
  - 14.5. Environmental hazards
  - 14.6. Special precautions for user
  - 14.7. Transport in bulk according to Annex II of MARPOL and the IBC Code
- SECTION 15: Regulatory information
  - 15.1. Safety, health and environmental regulations/legislation specific for the substance or mixture
  - 15.2. Chemical safety assessment
- SECTION 16: Other information
  - 16.2. Date of the latest revision of the SDS

== National and international requirements ==
=== Canada ===
In Canada, the program known as the Workplace Hazardous Materials Information System (WHMIS) establishes the requirements for SDSs in workplaces and is administered federally by Health Canada under the Hazardous Products Act, Part II, and the Controlled Products Regulations.

=== European Union ===
Safety data sheets have been made an integral part of the system of Regulation (EC) No 1907/2006 (REACH). The original requirements of REACH for SDSs have been further adapted to take into account the rules for safety data sheets of the Global Harmonised System (GHS) and the implementation of other elements of the GHS into EU legislation that were introduced by Regulation (EC) No 1272/2008 (CLP) via an update to Annex II of REACH.

The SDS must be supplied in an official language of the Member State(s) where the substance or mixture is placed on the market, unless the Member State(s) concerned provide(s) otherwise (Article 31(5) of REACH).

The European Chemicals Agency (ECHA) has published a guidance document on the compilation of safety data sheets.

==== Germany ====
In Germany, safety data sheets must be compiled in accordance with REACH Regulation No. 1907/2006. The requirements concerning national aspects are defined in the Technical Rule for Hazardous Substances (TRGS) 220 "National aspects when compiling safety data sheets". A national measure mentioned in SDS section 15 is as example the water hazard class (WGK) it is based on regulations governing systems for handling substances hazardous to waters (AwSV).

==== The Netherlands ====
Dutch Safety Data Sheets are well known as veiligheidsinformatieblad or Chemiekaarten. This is a collection of Safety Data Sheets of the most widely used chemicals. The Chemiekaarten boek is commercially available, but also made available through educational institutes, such as the web site offered by the University of Groningen.

=== South Africa ===
This section contributes to a better understanding of the regulations governing SDS within the South African framework. As regulations may change, it is the responsibility of the reader to verify the validity of the regulations mentioned in text.

As globalisation increased and countries engaged in cross-border trade, the quantity of hazardous material crossing international borders amplified. Realising the detrimental effects of hazardous trade, the United Nations established a committee of experts specialising in the transportation of hazardous goods. The committee provides best practises governing the conveyance of hazardous materials and goods for land including road and railway; air as well as sea transportation. These best practises are constantly updated to remain current and relevant.

There are various other international bodies who provide greater detail and guidance for specific modes of transportation such as the International Maritime Organisation (IMO) by means of the International Maritime Code and the International Civil Aviation Organisation (ICAO) via the Technical Instructions for the safe transport of dangerous goods by air as well as the International Air Transport Association (IATA) who provides regulations for the transport of dangerous goods.

These guidelines prescribed by the international authorities are applicable to the South African land, sea and air transportation of hazardous materials and goods. In addition to these rules and regulations to International best practice, South Africa has also implemented common laws which are laws based on custom and practise. Common laws are a vital part of maintaining public order and forms the basis of case laws. Case laws, using the principles of common law are interpretations and decisions of statutes made by courts. Acts of parliament are determinations and regulations by parliament which form the foundation of statutory law. Statutory laws are published in the government gazette or on the official website. Lastly, subordinate legislation are the bylaws issued by local authorities and authorised by parliament.

Statutory law gives effect to the Occupational Health and Safety Act of 1993 and the National Road Traffic Act of 1996. The Occupational Health and Safety Act details the necessary provisions for the safe handling and storage of hazardous materials and goods whilst the transport act details with the necessary provisions for the transportation of the hazardous goods.

Relevant South African legislation includes the Hazardous Chemicals Agent regulations of 2021 under the Occupational Health and Safety Act of 1993, the Chemical Substance Act 15 of 1973, and the National Road Traffic Act of 1996, and the Standards Act of 2008.

There has been selective incorporation of aspects of the Globally Harmonised System (GHS) of Classification and Labelling of Chemicals into South African legislation. At each point of the chemical value chain, there is a responsibility to manage chemicals in a safe and responsible manner. SDS is therefore required by law. A SDS is included in the requirements of Occupational Health and Safety Act, 1993 (Act No.85 of 1993) Regulation 1179 dated 25 August 1995.

The categories of information supplied in the SDS are listed in SANS 11014:2010; dangerous goods standards – Classification and information. SANS 11014:2010 supersedes the first edition SANS 11014-1:1994 and is an identical implementation of ISO 11014:2009. According to SANS 11014:2010:

=== United Kingdom ===
In the U.K., the Chemicals (Hazard Information and Packaging for Supply) Regulations 2002 - known as CHIP Regulations - impose duties upon suppliers, and importers into the EU, of hazardous materials.

NOTE: Safety data sheets (SDS) are no longer covered by the CHIP regulations. The laws that require a SDS to be provided have been transferred to the European REACH Regulations.

The Control of Substances Hazardous to Health (COSHH) Regulations govern the use of hazardous substances in the workplace in the UK and specifically require an assessment of the use of a substance. Regulation 12 requires that an employer provides employees with information, instruction and training for people exposed to hazardous substances. This duty would be very nearly impossible without the data sheet as a starting point. It is important for employers therefore to insist on receiving a data sheet from a supplier of a substance.

The duty to supply information is not confined to informing only business users of products. SDSs for retail products sold by large DIY shops are usually obtainable on those companies' web sites.

Web sites of manufacturers and large suppliers do not always include them even if the information is obtainable from retailers but written or telephone requests for paper copies will usually be responded to favourably.

=== United Nations ===
The United Nations (UN) defines certain details used in SDSs such as the UN numbers used to identify some hazardous materials in a standard form while in international transit.

=== United States ===
In the U.S., the Occupational Safety and Health Administration requires that SDSs be readily available to all employees for potentially harmful substances handled in the workplace under the Hazard Communication Standard. The SDS is also required to be made available to local fire departments and local and state emergency planning officials under Section 311 of the Emergency Planning and Community Right-to-Know Act. The American Chemical Society defines Chemical Abstracts Service Registry Numbers (CAS numbers) which provide a unique number for each chemical and are also used internationally in SDSs.

Reviews of material safety data sheets by the U.S. Chemical Safety and Hazard Investigation Board have detected dangerous deficiencies.

The board's Combustible Dust Hazard Study analyzed 140 data sheets of substances capable of producing combustible dusts. None of the SDSs contained all the information the board said was needed to work with the material safely, and 41 percent failed to even mention that the substance was combustible.

As part of its study of an explosion and fire that destroyed the Barton Solvents facility in Valley Center, Kansas, in 2007, the safety board reviewed 62 material safety data sheets for commonly used nonconductive flammable liquids. As in the combustible dust study, the board found all the data sheets inadequate.

In 2012, the US adopted the 16 section Safety Data Sheet to replace Material Safety Data Sheets. This became effective on 1 December 2013. These new Safety Data Sheets comply with the Globally Harmonized System of Classification and Labeling of Chemicals (GHS). By 1 June 2015, employers were required to have their workplace labeling and hazard communication programs updated as necessary – including all MSDSs replaced with SDS-formatted documents.

== SDS authoring ==
Many companies offer the service of collecting, or writing and revising, data sheets to ensure they are up to date and available for their subscribers or users. Some jurisdictions impose an explicit duty of care that each SDS be regularly updated, usually every three to five years. However, when new information becomes available, the SDS must be revised without delay. If a full SDS is not feasible, then a reduced workplace label should be authored.

== See also ==
- International Chemical Safety Cards – Format of safety information
- Materials database
- Data collection system
- Occupational exposure banding
- Risk and Safety Statements – System of hazard codes and phrases for labeling dangerous chemicals and compounds
