= REACH authorisation procedure =

The authorisation procedure is one of the regulatory tools of the European regulation (EC) REACH n°1907/2006 aiming to ban the use of substances of very high concern (SVHC) included in the Annex XIV of REACH, so as to replace them with technically and economically feasible alternatives.

This process concerns manufacturers, importers and downstream users of substances. Only representatives of foreign manufacturers can also apply for an authorisation.

Authorisation today impacts many industries, including the aerospace, electronics, automotive, energy, and paint industries. Moreover, defence applications are not de facto exempted from the authorisation process. Member states must decide on a case by case basis whether a company can benefit or not from this procedure (outlined in article 2.3 of REACH).

== General principles ==
The REACh regulation relies on four main procedures: registration, evaluation, restriction and authorisation of chemical substances.

== From the Candidate List to the Annex XIV of REACH ==
EU Member States or the European Chemicals Agency, on request of the European Commission, can submit propositions to identify Substances of Very High Concern, based on the criteria laid down in article 57 of REACH:

- Carcinogenic, mutagenic or toxic for reproduction meeting the criteria for classification as CMR category 1A or 1B, in accordance with Regulation n°1272/2008 (CLP),
- Persistents bioaccumulative and toxic (PBT),
- Very persistent and very bioaccumulative (vPvB),
- Or substances of equivalent concern.

This work is supported by Expert Groups of ECHA and the EU Member States and is based on various criteria and screening methodologies in order to identify the most relevant SVHCs.

Annex XIV is the last step of this prioritisation process. It lists SVHCs which exhibit a particularly high risk for human health or the environment (based on their inherent properties, quantities and uses) in order to forbid their use in the EU market.

Recommendations to include SVHCs in the Annex XIV are made by ECHA and are debated by all relevant stakeholders (Member States, companies, NGOs, etc.). The final decision of inclusion of the substance into Annex XIV is taken by the European Commission.

When listed in Annex XIV of the REACh regulation, a substance is therefore assigned a “sunset date” after which its use will be banned, unless an Authorisation is granted for a definite period of time.

As of today (2022/03/02), 223 substances are listed on the Candidate List and 54 substances (date 2022/03/02) are listed in the Annex XIV. The candidate list is usually updated every 6 months and the Annex XIV is updated every 12 to 18 months.

=== Scope of authorisation ===
The authorisation procedure is complex and concerns manufacturers, importers, downstream users and Only Representatives of substances for which:

- No alternative to the Annex XIV substance is deemed technically and/or economically feasible or for which
- Alternatives may exist but still need time to be fully qualified and deployed.

The banning of the use takes effect at the "Sunset date". As of this date, the use of the substance is only possible for companies which have been granted an authorisation or for those that have submitted their dossier before the Latest Application Date. The latter indeed benefit from a transitional period, pending the EU Commission final decision.

An exception is made for downstream users in the case where an upstream stakeholder, within the supply chain, has been granted an authorisation for this very substance and this very use. From this point of view, it is the supply chain of the substance that matters. For instance, subcontractors of authorised importers will not be covered if the Annex XIV substance they use is supplied via a supply chain for which no authorisation application has been made or granted.

Finally, downstream users that do not need to apply for an authorisation nevertheless have the obligation to notify their use(s) to ECHA (art. 66 of REACH) and check the compliance of their risk management measures.

Concerned companies are thus invited to take measures as soon as a substance they use enters the Candidate list by enquiring on the impacted actors and their strategies.

=== The use applied for ===
==== "Use" under the authorisation process ====
Authorisation applications are made for one or several specific uses. Article 3 of REACH thus defines a “use” as: “any processing, formulation, consumption, storage, keeping, treatment, filling into containers, transfer from one container to another, mixing, production of an article or any other use”.

In the framework of an authorisation dossier, the description of the use applied for has to specify the market, the supply chain, processes or the type of articles concerned. The use applied for has to be consistent enough to cover the Exposure Scenario but also the Analysis of Alternatives. The Use applied for should not be mistaken with the identified use which corresponds to the REACH registration process. An identified use focuses on the process and does not consider performances or markets questions.

==== Cases where no authorisation is needed ====
A few exceptions exist, for which the application for authorisation is not required:

- The manufacturer of a substance does not require an authorisation since it is not considered as a use,
- Impurities, additives and components of another substance do not constitute a use of the substance as such (except if annex XIV refers to it),
- The formulation of a mixture is considered as a use under REACh and the substance of the Annex XIV is only subject to authorisation if it exceeds the required concentrations.

If the production of an article may require an authorisation at some point, finished articles themselves do not require an authorisation to be put on the market, even though they still contain a substance subject to authorisation. Consequently, articles requiring the use of an Annex XIV substance can still be produced outside the EU and then imported. In that particular case, future restrictions procedure could however limit the placing on the market of such articles if a risk remains (art. 58.6 of REACH).

=== Review period ===
The review period is the duration for which the EU Commission authorises the use of a substance after the Sunset date.

Following durations are considered for the review periods:

- < 7 years: in case the Analysis of Alternatives report is insufficient and/or doubts remain on the impacts of the granting of an authorisation or, alternatively, when a quick transition is possible;
- 7 years: standard duration to develop a technically and economically feasible alternative solution;
- 12 years and > 12 years: long cycle of investments, low risks. In exceptional cases, a longer duration may be considered if it can be demonstrated that 12 years would create disproportionate impacts compared with a longer review period.

At the end of the review period, the application for authorisation is reassessed to evaluate the progress made in terms or research & development or substitution. Applications to extend the review period have to be made at the latest 18 months before the expiry date.

The European Commission may also reduce this duration if new circumstances appear, in terms of risks or impacts.

Only the Court of the European Union is qualified to rule on appeals for applications for authorisation. Member States are, in turn, responsible for controlling the decision's implementation.

== The Application For Authorisation dossier (AFA) ==
The application for authorisation (AfA) is made up of three main parts: the Chemical Safety Report (CSR), the Analysis of Alternatives (AoA) and the Socio-Economic Analysis (SEA).

The goal of this dossier is to demonstrate that no alternative substance is immediately available, that risks are controlled and that the social and economic advantages of the use of the substance outweigh the risks to human health or the environment. The dossier usually takes 6 to 18 months of preparation and ECHA's guidelines are available to assist with its drafting.

The application for authorisation should be filed before the Latest Application Date (LAD), set at 18 months before the sunset date. The LAD enables to benefit from a transitional period, pending the European Commission's decision.

=== Basic of an AfA ===
An AfA can be made for one or several substances (in that case, grouping will need to be demonstrated on the basis of annex XI of REACH), one or several uses applied for and by one or several companies. The latter case is called a joint application and it requires appointing a main applicant that will be the contact point for ECHA.

=== Two submissions routes ===
Two submission routes are planned by the REACh regulation:

	Adequate control route (Art. 60, paragraphe 2)	Socio-economic route (Art. 60, paragraphe 4)
General principles	Risks are adequately controlled during the substance's lifecycle	Advantages of the use of the substance outweigh the risks to human health or the environment
Criteria	Exposure levels do not exceed DNEL or PNEC AND; The likelihood and severity of an event is negligible	Adequate control cannot be demonstrated AND; There are no suitable alternative substances or processes
Documents of attach	Chemical Safety Reports; Analysis of Alternatives; Substitution plan (if relevant); Socioeconomic Analysis (not compulsory but strongly advised should the adequate control route fail); Justification for not considering certain risks (if relevant)	Chemical Safety Reports; Analysis of Alternatives; Socio-economic analysis; Justification for not considering certain risks (if relevant)

=== Content of the dossier ===
==== Chemical Safety Report (CSR) ====
For the adequate control route, the goal of the Chemical Safety Report is to prove that threshold values are respected; for the socio-economic route, the goal of the Chemical Safety Report is to demonstrate that risks are reduced to the minimum.

The Chemical Safety Report contains:

- A summary of the risk management measure
- A declaration on the implementation and the communication of risk management measures along the supply chain
- The identity of the substance and the identified uses
- The assessment of the human and environmental hazard assessment
- The assessment of the properties for which the substance was included in Annex XIV
- The exposure assessment
- The risk characterisation

==== Analysis of Alternatives (AoA) ====
The AoA aims to demonstrate that no alternative is appropriate, i.e. technically and / or economically feasible, less risky and available.

The Analysis of Alternatives therefore presents all the substance's alternative solutions and contains:

- Part 1 – Summary
- Part 2 – Description of substance's purpose
- Part 3 – Identification of potential alternatives
- Part 4 – Description of the suitability and availability of alternatives
- Part 5 – Conclusion of the report

==== Socio-Economic Analysis (SEA) ====
The Socio-Economic Analysis is a compulsory document for the socio-economic route and can also complete an application justified by the adequate control route. It aims to demonstrate that the advantages of the use of the substance outweigh the risks to human health or the environment. For this purpose, applicants must compare two scenarios: the ‘use scenario’ (continued use of the substance) on the one hand and the ‘non-use scenario’ (cease of use of the substance) on the other hand to discuss their impacts.

It contains:

- Part 1 – Summary
- Part 2 – Definition of the objective and scope
- Part 3 – Analysis of impacts
- Part 4 – Comparison of impacts
- Part 5 – Conclusion of the report

=== Submission of the dossier ===
Dossiers should be submitted during submission windows in February, May, August and November. ECHA strongly advise to follow these windows as plenary sessions of the two committees (RAC and SEAC) are organised in March, June, September and December of each year. Submitting before the plenary sessions, during the submission windows, therefore helps the efficient assessment of the application.

Applications are deemed received after business rules check is successfully passed and provided ECHA fees are paid on time.

=== Examination of the dossier ===
The examination of the dossier is carried out by the Risk Assessment Committee (RAC) and the Socio-Economic Analysis Committee (SEAC) and opens with a public consultation on alternatives. During 8 weeks, companies, NGOs or any other interested party have the possibility to comment on and possibly challenge the alternatives proposed by the applicant.

The consultation can be followed by additional discussions with the two Committees in order to clarify the application. This process is called Trialogue and stakeholders can be invited to participate.

Duration of the examination varies according to the complexity and the clarity of the dossier. Committees however have the obligation to deliver their first opinion on the dossier 10 months after its submission at the latest. The dossier with the Committee's opinion is then sent to the Commission. The whole process can take up to 2 years.

== Implementation and feedback ==
As of May 4, 2015, 28 applications for authorisation had been filed for a total of 56 uses.

Substances	Number of applications for authorisation	Number of applicants	Number of uses
DEHP	5	7	10
DBP	2	2	4
[DEHP + DBP]	1	1	3
Lead chromate Yellow + Red	1	1	12
HBCDD	1	13	2
Diarsenic trioxide	4	4	5
Trichloroethylene	13	15	19
Lead chromate	1	1	1
TOTAL	28	44	56

=== A specific strategy for every use ===
Each dossier requires implementing a specific strategy, being it to define the uses, the analysis of the industrial processes and associated risks, the alternatives, or the socio-economic impacts of the banning of the substance.

Committees expect each dossier to contain a precise description of the industrial process and the operational conditions that are representative of the dossier as well as the risk management measures implemented by the applicant

The main issue in the application for authorisation process is the duration of the review period which will be granted. It is therefore critical to bring all the necessary precisions to the dossiers to justify the requested review period duration. A justification that is too weak or an argumentation that is too generic may induce the granting of a shorter-than-requested review period.

=== An in-depth analysis of the companies’ activity ===
Beyond the simple drafting of the application for authorisation dossier, the whole process implies both expertise and deep analysis of a company's activity, on multiple aspects:

- Technical aspects(Chemical Safety Report, Analysis of Alternatives),
- Business aspects (Supply chain security, public consultation) and
- Strategic aspects (Anticipating the development and growth of the activity within a 5 to 10 years timeframe).

This analysis therefore requires an extensive collection of information and also, possibly, contacts with customers so as to strengthen the analysis of alternatives.

=== Public consultation at the heart of the decision ===
Public consultation is one of the core mechanisms of the authorisation process. Stakeholders’ (competing companies, universities, laboratories, NGOS, Member States, etc.) involvement in the consultation process has been growing over the last years (to reach up to 400 comments for a single dossier) and the influence of comments, in particular concerning alternatives, makes it a major step of the authorisation process. In order to streamline this process, templates for comments and instructions are available on the ECHA website.

=== Consulting costs ===
Consulting costs of an application for authorisation have been estimated by ECHA and amounts, in average, to around 230,000 EUR for a single use.
