= Klimisch score =

The Klimisch score is a method of assessing the reliability of toxicological studies, mainly for regulatory purposes, that was proposed by H.J. Klimisch, M. Andreae and U. Tillmann of the chemical company BASF in 1997 in a paper entitled A Systematic Approach for Evaluating the Quality of Experimental Toxicological and Ecotoxicological Data which was published in Regulatory Toxicology and Pharmacology. It assigns studies to one of four categories as follows:

Score	Description	Details (quoted from paper)
1	Reliable without restriction	"This includes studies or data from the literature or reports which were carried out or generated according to generally valid and/or internationally accepted testing guidelines (preferably performed according to GLP) or in which the test parameters documented are based on a specific (national) testing guideline (preferably performed according to GLP) or in which all parameters described are closely related/comparable to a guideline method"
2	Reliable with restriction	"This includes studies or data from the literature, reports (mostly not performed according to GLP), in which the test parameters documented do not totally comply with the specific testing guideline, but are sufficient to accept the data or in which investigations are described which cannot be subsumed under a testing guideline, but which are nevertheless well documented and scientifically acceptable."
3	Not reliable	"This includes studies or data from the literature/reports in which there are interferences between the measuring system and the test substance or in which organisms/test systems were used which are not relevant in relation to the exposure (e.g., unphysiologic pathways of application) or which were carried out or generated according to a method which is not acceptable, the documentation of which is not sufficient for an assessment and which is not convincing for an expert judgment."
4	Not assignable	"This includes studies or data from the literature, which do not give sufficient experimental details and which are only listed in short abstracts or secondary literature (books, reviews, etc.)."

The applicable guidelines are the (OECD Guidelines for the Testing of Chemicals, EU Test Methods), and other such methods. Often studies are performed to more than one test guideline where they are in agreement as to the requirements. GLP is Good Laboratory Practice.

The scoring system is the standard method used in both the EU regulatory schemes (e.g. REACH Regulation). Generally, only Klimisch scores of 1 or 2 can be used by themselves to cover an endpoint. However, Klimisch score 3 and 4 data can still be used as supporting studies or as part of a weight of evidence approach. The Klimisch score can be found as a standard field within the IUCLID database.

ECHA has produced guidance on how to assess the reliability of data

Klimisch score has been criticized for favoring studies conducted under Good Laboratory Practice guidelines, which are mostly industry-funded studies. A reliable study according to the Klimisch score can actually be highly flawed. Klimisch score does not assess a number of study design criteria: randomization, blinding, sample size calculation, ….

== ToxRTool ==
The ToxRTool was developed to assist with Klimisch scoring.
