= Substitute It Now! list =

The Substitute It Now! List is a database developed by the International Chemical Secretariat (ChemSec) of chemicals the uses of which are likely to become legally restricted under EU REACH regulation. The list is being used by public interest groups as a campaign tool to advocate for increasing the pace of implementation of REACH and by commercial interests to identify substances for control in chemicals management programmes.

== History and development ==
The SIN List is composed of chemicals evaluated by the environmental NGO ChemSec as meeting EU criteria for being Substances of Very High Concern (SVHCs) under Article 57 of REACH, being either carcinogenic, mutagenic or reprotoxic (CMR), persistent, bioaccumulative and toxic (PBT), very persistent and very bioaccumulative (vPvB), or posing an equivalent environmental or health threat.,

The first SIN List, known as version 1.0, was published in 2008 and identified 267 chemicals as meeting the Article 57 criteria for being SVHCs. ChemSec's assessment was independently validated by the Technical University of Denmark.

In 2009 a further 89 substances were added to the SIN List (Version 1.1), before in 2011 another 22 chemicals were added (Version 2.0) for fulfilling the REACH 57(f) criterion of equivalent concern as endocrine disrupting chemicals (EDCs). The 2011 EDC additions were made in consultation with TEDX, the US endocrine-disruption research NGO founded by Professor Theo Colborn, and coincided with EU plans over 2011–2012 to develop accepted criteria for identifying endocrine disrupting chemicals.

In October 2014, the list was updated, this time with 28 new chemicals. With this update, the SIN List was also divided into 31 groups, and a tool for sustainable substitution based on the SIN List – SINimilarity – was presented.

== SIN List Advisory Committee ==
The development of the SIN List is guided by a nine-member NGO advisory committee:

- The Center for International Environmental Law
- The European Consumers’ Organisation
- CHEM Trust
- Clean Production Action (CPA)
- Greenpeace European Unit
- European Environmental Bureau
- ClientEarth
- Friends of the Earth Europe
- European Trade Union Institute
- Women in Europe for a Common Future
- The Health and Environment Alliance

== Impact ==
=== EU Legislation ===
The disparity between the length of the SIN List in comparison to the 15 chemicals nominated by the EU as SVHCs in October 2008 was used to pressure the European regulatory authorities and Member States to accelerate the nomination process. In 2011 Members of the European Parliament's Environment Committee cited the SIN List in criticising the European Commission for continuing slow progress on EDCs and evaluation of safety of chemicals in mixtures.

EU regulators have been cautiously welcoming of the SIN List. Margot Wallström, Vice-President of the European Commission, stated that she welcomed initiatives such as the SIN List “[which] draw the attention of the public and industry to the most hazardous chemicals that should be a priority for inclusion in the REACH authorisation procedure”. European Commissioner for the Environment Janez Potočnik has referred to the SIN list as “[indicating] the substances the European Commission will take into consideration for placement on the candidate list. Industry representative group CEFIC has criticised the publication of the list for occurring outside the legal design of REACH.

=== Commercial substitution ===
Sony Ericsson, Sara Lee, Skanska, Marks & Spencer, Dell and Carrefour are on record as referring to the SIN List in their chemical substitution programmes. The SIN List is also used by other public interest groups in lobbying companies to substitute or phase out hazardous chemicals.

=== Socially Responsible Investment ===
The potential for legal restrictions on chemical use increasing costs associated with reformulating products and modifying processes has resulted in SIN List data being used by investment analysis firms concerned with Socially Responsible Investment, to aid in calculating financial risk posed by companies’ sustainability profiles.

In March 2013 ChemSec published the SIN Producers List, a list of the 709 companies manufacturing or importing SIN List substances in the EU. The list is derived from data presented in the European Chemicals Agency (ECHA) database of registered substances.

ChemSec has together with ClientEarth requested information about producers of REACH registered substances to be made publicly available, and launched a lawsuit against the European Chemicals Agency on this issue in 2011.

== Related documents ==
- Comprehensive SIN List methodology
- SIN 2.0 (Endocrine Disruptors) Methodology
- Summary of the SIN List for the public
- REACH Article 57: THE EUROPEAN PARLIAMENT AND THE COUNCIL OF THE EUROPEAN UNION, (2006). REGULATION (EC) No 1907/2006 OF THE EUROPEAN PARLIAMENT AND OF THE COUNCIL of 18 December 2006 concerning the Registration, Evaluation, Authorisation and Restriction of Chemicals (REACH), establishing a European Chemicals Agency, amending Directive 1999/45/EC and repealing Council Regulation (EEC) No 793/93 and Commission Regulation (EC) No 1488/94 as well as Council Directive 76/769/EEC and Commission Directives 91/155/EEC, 93/67/EEC, 93/105/EC and 2000/21/EC. Official Journal of the European Union. p. 396/142 (PDF, English)
