= ChemSec =

Swedish nonprofit environmental organization

The International Chemical Secretariat, ChemSec
- Founded: 2002
- Founder: Swedish offices of World Wide Fund for Nature and Friends of the Earth, the Swedish Society for Nature Conservation and Nature and Youth Sweden
- Type: [governmental funded organisation (the Swedish Chemicals Agency (KEMI) contributes approx. 3/4 to the budget) ]
- Purpose: Chemicals management and policy
- Location: Gothenburg, Sweden
- Region served: EU legislation; some environmental justice and development activities in Eastern Europe, Africa and Asia
- Method: Political advocacy
- Website: www.chemsec.org

The International Chemical Secretariat (ChemSec) is a non-profit environmental organisation founded in Sweden in 2002 to advocate in favour of stricter regulatory controls on potentially hazardous chemicals and to work with businesses on reducing the production and use of hazardous substances in their products and supply chains. ChemSec receives about 25 percent of its funding from the Swedish Government, the rest comes from foundations, mainly in the EU and the US, as well as from individuals. ChemSec maintains the SIN List, identifying hazardous substances likely to be restricted under EU REACH regulation.

== History ==
ChemSec was founded in 2002 by the Swedish offices of the World Wide Fund for Nature and Friends of the Earth, the Swedish Society for Nature Conservation and Nature and Youth. ChemSec is funded by governments and private grant-making trusts and foundations.

ChemSec argued in favour of tighter controls on chemicals in Europe under REACH, publishing analyses which contradicted industry estimates of the economic impact of the legislation. Since REACH entered into force ChemSec has continued to press for stricter chemicals regulation in the EU, arguing in favour of increasing the number of chemicals restricted under the RoHS Directive and in 2008 publishing the first version of the SIN List, a campaign tool to accelerate implementation of REACH and to help businesses identify hazardous substances.

Between 2005 and 2007 ChemSec worked with Eastern European NGOs on strengthening chemicals management and legislation in those countries. From 2006 to 2008, ChemSec worked with African and Asian NGOs on poverty and human rights issues relating to chemicals. In 2010 ChemSec was commissioned to produce a research report on flow of information in the electronics supply chain for the International Conference on Chemicals Management (ICCM) programme within the United Nations Environment Program.

== Guiding principles ==
ChemSec's stated objectives are to “bridge the gap between decision-makers, industry, NGOs and scientists and offer expertise and guidance on chemical management policies in order to get progressive chemicals legislation.” ChemSec also works with companies to secure their support for progressive chemicals legislation and reduce their use of hazardous chemicals by substituting harmful substances for safer ones. ChemSec's interpretation of “progressive” chemicals policy incorporates the principles of precaution, substitution, polluter pays and right-to-know.

== European chemicals regulation ==
=== REACH ===
Influencing REACH was a priority for ChemSec until the regulation was passed in 2006. ChemSec argued in favour of stricter controls on chemical use on the basis of commercial advantages and scientific evidence of benefits to human and environmental health.

ChemSec's research with the Global Development and Environmental Institute at Tufts University, Boston, into the costs of implementing REACH formed the basis of a 2004 Nordic Council of Ministers study, which concluded that the chemicals industry was overestimating the costs of changes to the new chemicals regulation in Europe.

In 2006, the European Parliament commissioned ChemSec to produce a further report on the implications of REACH for developing countries. The report concluded that concerns about the potential for REACH to interfere with trade patterns were largely unfounded.

=== RoHS ===
In 2010, ChemSec secured support from some manufacturers for their proposals to restrict the use of brominated flame retardants and PVC in electronic goods under the RoHS Directive. Although the EU rejected immediate restriction of specific substances, new measures to restrict substances likely to produce hazardous pollutants were included in the recast of the legislation.

=== Endocrine disrupting chemicals ===
In 2011, ChemSec proposed a set of chemicals whose use should be legally restricted for their potential to disrupt hormone signalling. The move, via ChemSec's SIN List initiative, coincides with EU plans over 2011–2012 to develop accepted regulatory criteria for endocrine disruptors (EDCs) and further restrict their use.

== Substitution of hazardous chemicals ==
=== SIN List ===
The SIN (Substitute It Now!) List is a list of chemicals evaluated by ChemSec as meeting EU criteria for being Substances of Very High Concern (SVHCs) under article 57 of REACH and whose use in future is therefore likely to be legally restricted. There is evidence from meetings in the European Parliament that the SIN List, in particular the addition of EDCs in 2011, is influencing which substances are being prioritised for the REACH process.

=== Socially responsible investment ===
The potential for legal restrictions on chemical use increasing costs associated with reformulating products and modifying processes has resulted in SIN List data being used by investment analysis firms concerned with Socially Responsible Investment, to aid in calculating financial risk posed by companies’ sustainability profiles. In 2012 ChemSec presented a catalogue of criteria to enable financial investors to evaluate the performance of the chemical industry., and in 2013 ChemSec published a list of the European companies producing SIN List chemicals.

=== SUBSPORT ===
To address the challenge of replacing hazardous substances with chemicals which have a genuine pedigree of safety, ChemSec is involved in the SUBSPORT project, an internet portal collating legal information and case studies on substitution, and databases of hazardous substances and their alternatives.

== Business relations ==
In 2004, ChemSec established its business group as a forum for multinational corporations to discuss chemicals management, develop initiatives for reducing the use of hazardous substances and advocate for progressive chemicals policy in Europe. In 2011 the group had the following members:

- Apple (on an ad-hoc basis)
- Boots UK
- Coop Denmark
- Dell
- EUREAU
- H&M Group (on an ad-hoc basis)
- IKEA (on an ad-hoc basis)
- Kingfisher
- Lego
- Polestar
- Shaw Industries
- Skanska
- Sony

ChemSec has published reports presenting arguments from companies in favour of stricter chemicals regulation under REACH and tougher restrictions on halogenated compounds under the RoHS Directive, as described in a number of business position statements.

== International networks and development ==
In 2006, ChemSec surveyed and advocated for improved chemicals management and handling in Belarus, Ukraine and Russia. In 2008, ChemSec and the Swedish Society for Nature Conservation administered a small-grant funding programme in Africa and Asia to support NGO projects to reduce harm from toxic chemicals and promote safer chemicals management.

In 2011, ChemSec published a United Nations Environment Programme Study on Information on Chemicals in Products (CiP), part of data for developing recommendations to the International Conference on Chemicals Management (ICCM), the decision-making body of the Strategic Approach to International Chemicals Management (SAICM).

ChemSec is a member of the International POPs Elimination Network, working on the Stockholm Convention, and a member of Health Care Without Harm and the European Environmental Bureau.

== Board members ==
- Helena Norin, Swedish Society for Nature Conservation (chairperson)
- Erik Pettersson, WWF Sweden
- Sven-Erik Sjöstrand, Friends of the Earth Sweden
- Haldor Lorimer-Olsson, Nature and Youth Sweden

== Key publications ==
- "Information on Chemicals in Electronic Products — a study of needs, gaps, obstacles and solutions to provide and access information on chemicals in electronic products". 2011.
- "Greening Consumer Electronics: Moving Away from Bromine and Chlorine". 2009.
- "Substitution 1.0 — the art of delivering toxic-free products". 2008.
- "Implications of REACH for developing countries". 2006.
- "What we need from REACH — views on the proposal for a new chemical legislation within EU". 2005.
- "Cry wolf — predicted costs by industry in the face of new regulations". 2004.
