= 2,4,6-Tri-tert-butylphenol =

Names
- Preferred IUPAC name 2,4,6-Tri-tert-butylphenol
- Other names 2,4,6-TTBP

Identifiers
CAS Number	732-26-3
3D model (JSmol)	Interactive image
ChEMBL	ChEMBL387905
ChemSpider	12368
ECHA InfoCard	100.010.900
EC Number	211-989-5
PubChem CID	12902
UNII	99J2VIC675
CompTox Dashboard (EPA)	DTXSID2021311
- InChI: InChI=1S/C18H30O/c1-16(2,3)12-10-13(17(4,5)6)15(19)14(11-12)18(7,8)9/h10-11,19H,1-9H3 Key: PFEFOYRSMXVNEL-UHFFFAOYSA-N
- SMILES: CC(C)(C)C1=CC(=C(C(=C1)C(C)(C)C)O)C(C)(C)C

Properties
Chemical formula	C_{18}H_{30}O
Molar mass	262.437 g·mol^{−1}

Hazards
- GHS labelling
Pictograms	(GHS07: Exclamation mark) (GHS09: Environmental hazard)
Signal word	Warning
Hazard statements	H302, H315, H319, H410
Precautionary statements	P264, P270, P273, P280, P301+P312, P302+P352, P305+P351+P338, P321, P330, P332+P313, P337+P313, P362, P391, P501
- Except where otherwise noted, data are given for materials in their standard state (at 25 °C [77 °F], 100 kPa). Infobox references

2,4,6-Tri-tert-butylphenol (2,4,6-TTBP) is a phenol symmetrically substituted with three tert-butyl groups and thus strongly sterically hindered. 2,4,6-TTBP is a readily oxidizable aromatic compound and a weak acid. It oxidizes to give the deep-blue 2,4,6-tri-tert-butylphenoxy radical. 2,4,6-TTBP is related to 2,6-di-tert-butylphenol, which is widely used as an antioxidant in industrial applications. These compounds are colorless solids.

== Preparation ==
The preparation of 2,4,6-tri-tert-butylphenol has been studied extensively. As early as 1890, Wilhelm Koenigs described the acid-catalyzed reaction of phenol with isobutylene. Many other reports have appeared. Yields up to 90% have been reported. Typical side products are the result of incomplete alkylation: 4-tert-butylphenol (4-TBP), 2,4-di-tert-butylphenol (2,4-DTBP), 2,6-di-tert-butylphenol (2,6-DTBP). 2,5-Di-tert-butylphenol (2,5-DTB) has been observed. 2,4,6-tri-tert-butylphenol is also found as a by-product in the synthesis of the disubstitution products 2,4-DTBP and 2,6-DTBP, which are more widely used antioxidants.

Synthese von 2,4,6-Tri-tert-butylphenol mit Isobuten

A synthesis of 2,4,6-tri-tert-butylphenol has been described that is also suitable as a teaching experiment. Methyl tert-butyl ether is used as the alkylating agent and sulfuric acid as catalyst. 2,4,6-TTBP is being obtained in 69% yield.

Synthese von 2,4,6-TTBP mit Methyl-tert-butylether (MTBE)

== Properties ==
2,4,6-Tri-tert-butylphenol is a white solid which dissolves in many organic solvents, but not in aqueous or alcoholic alkaline solutions. The green-blue coloring with iron(III)chloride, which is characteristic for phenols, does not occur in 2,4,6-TTBP. The compound is oxidizable in air but practically non-biodegradable.

As an electron-rich aromatic, 2,4,6-tri-tert-butylphenol can also be easily oxidized electrochemically. In the alkaline, the phenolate anion formed is first oxidized in a reversible reaction to the phenoxy radical. The stable radical is oxidized by further electron withdrawal to the phenoxonium cation, which reacts in water to give 2,4,6-tri-tert-butyl-4-hydroxy-2,5-cyclohexadienone.

Elektrochemische Oxidation von 2,4,6-TTBP

In acidic media, the hydroxydienone is dealkylated with the cleavage of the tert-butyl group in the 4-position to the 2,6-di-tert-butylhydroquinone, which is oxidized to the end product 2,6-di-tert-butyl-1,4-benzoquinone.

Dealkylierung zum 1,4-Benzochinon

The oxidation of 2,4,6-tri-tert-butylphenol in the alkaline to the intensely blue-colored phenoxy radical can also occur with potassium ferricyanide. The 2,4,6-tri-tert-butylphenoxy radical forms blue crystals on cooling to −70 °C which are stable at room temperature for several weeks and only gradually turn yellow. The phenoxy radical reacts with oxygen as a diradical to form a 4,4'-linked peroxide forming yellow crystals.

Oxidation von 2,4,6-TTBP mit Hexacyanoferrat (III) zum Peroxid

== Applications ==
The electron-rich 2,4,6-tri-tert-butylphenol can easily be oxidized to the phenoxy radical, which in the 4-position adds phenols, as well as alcohols and thiols to the corresponding cyclohexadienones. The cyclohexadienones, also referred to in the literature as Chinolether, cleave the 4-position tert-butyl group upon heating under acidic conditions and aromatizes back to the substituted phenol.

The reaction can be used for the synthesis of 2,6-di-tert-butyl-4-methoxyphenol, which is frequently used as an antioxidant.

Synthese von 2,6-Di-tert-butyl-4-methoxyphenol aus 2,4,6-TTBP

2,4,6-TTBP is used as stabilizers, free-radical scavengers and antioxidants in technical applications, such as in fuels, hydraulic fluids and lubricating oils, as well as in elastomeric and thermoplastic polymers. Because of its pronounced persistence, its high tendency for bioaccumulation and aquatic toxicity, 2,4,6-TTBP is only of low industrial use and is even forbidden, for example, in Japan.

The phenoxy radical of 2,4,6-TTBP is also described as a sterically demanding protecting group in a reagent for the transfer of a nucleophilic dimethylaminomethyl group [(CH_{3})_{2}-N-CH_{2}-] to form tertiary amines.

== Regulation ==
On January 23, 2024, on the basis of its being toxic for reproduction and being persistent, bioaccumulative, and toxic (PBT), 2,4,6-TTBP was added to EU REACH's Candidate List of Substances of Very High Concern (SVHC) for Authorization.
