= E-SDS =

An extended safety data sheet (e-SDS) is a document used to communicate detailed chemical safety information under the European Union’s REACH regulation 1907/2006/EC. It extends a safety data sheet standard 16-section that provides information about chemicals with an additional annex containing guidance on safe handling of hazardous substances. While following standard SDS structure, it also contains detailed information on exposure assessment and risk management.

== Exposure Scenarios ==
According to REACH Article 3, the definition of an exposure scenario (ES) is the set conditions including operational conditions and risk management measures that describe how the substance is manufactured and used, and how the manufacturer or importer recommends downstream users to control exposure to humans and the environment.

Exposure Scenarios typically include identification of the type of use, description of the operations, technical parameters such as pressure, temperature, and physical state, recommendation for ventilation, filtration, emission control, personal protective equipment (PPE) needed, DNEL and PNEC values, and Risk Characterization Rations (RCR) that shows the levels of safety for each use.

== When an e-SDS is required ==
Under the European Union (EU) REACH regulations, and extended safety data sheet is required for hazardous chemical substances imported in quantities greater than 10 Tonnes Per Annum (TPA).

An extended safety data sheet is also required when the substance has been classified as hazardous under the CLP Regulation of has been identified as Persistent, Bioaccumulative and Toxic (PBT) or very Persistent and very Bioaccumulative (vPvB). If a Chemical Safety Assessment (CSA) has been conducted for the substance, an e-SDS will be required.

== How long do e-SDS last ==
Extended safety data sheets do not have a validity period or expiration date in the European Union (EU), but they must be updated immediately when new hazard information emerges; risk management measures change, or restrictions are imposed. Even though extended safety data sheets do not expire, it is important to review them every 3-5 years. Reviewing extended safety data sheets every 3-5 years can help prevent outdated or incomplete information from being used in critical safety decisions.

== e-SDS target audience ==
The key target audience for safety data sheets and extended safety data sheets are downstream users, health and safety professionals, employers who are responsible for implementing risk management, including industrial safety offices, and supply chain partners.

REACH Regulations Article 37(2) states that "any distributor shall pass on relevant exposure scenarios, and use other relevant information, from the safety data sheet supplied to him when compiling his own safety data sheet for uses for which he has passed on information.

== Useful information ==
1. Main duties of downstream users
2. A brief REACH overview for distributors
