= TTBP =

TTBP can refer to

- 2,4,6-Tri-tert-butylpyrimidine
- 2,4,6-Tri-tert-butylphenol
