= European Chemicals Bureau =

The European Chemicals Bureau (ECB) was the focal point for the data and assessment procedure on dangerous chemicals within the European Union (EU). The ECB was located in Ispra, Italy, within the Joint Research Centre (JRC) of the European Commission. In 2008 the ECB completed its mandate. Some of its activities were taken over by the European Chemicals Agency (ECHA); others remained within the Joint Research Centre. The history of the ECB has been published as a JRC technical report.

== Mission ==
The mission of the formerly known European Chemicals Bureau (ECB) was to provide scientific and technical support for the conception, development, implementation and monitoring of EU policies on chemicals and consumer products. It co-ordinated the EU risk assessment programmes that covered the risks posed by existing substances and new substances to workers, consumers and the environment. It also developed guidance documents and tools in support of the REACH (Registration, Evaluation, Authorisation and Restriction of Chemicals) Regulation, the Testing Methods Regulation, the Globally Harmonised System of Classification and Labelling of Chemicals (GHS), the notification of new substances, the information exchange on import and export of dangerous substances, the development and harmonisation of testing methods and the authorisation of biocides.

== Biocides ==
The Biocides Work Area provided scientific and technical support for the approval of active substances in biocidal products as laid down in Directive 98/8/EC (Biocidal Products Directive, BPD) concerning the placing of biocidal products on the market. Currently, these tasks are dealt with by the biocides group within the IHCP. From 2013, coinciding with the coming-into-force of a new Biocidal Products Regulation (BPR), the European Chemicals Agency (ECHA) took over the biocides program.

== Existing Chemicals ==
The "Existing Chemicals" Work Area provided technical and scientific support to the European Commission concerning the data collection, priority setting, and risk assessment steps of Council Regulation (EEC) 793/93.

== New Chemicals ==
The "New Chemicals" Work Area included:

- Co-ordination of EU notification scheme and risk assessment for new chemical substances (Directive 67/548/EEC including Annexes VII and VIII, Directive 93/67/EEC).
- Management of the New Chemicals Database (NCD) maintained in a security area with authorised access only.
- Preparation of European LIst of Notified Chemical Substances (ELINCS).
- Supervision of Technical and Scientific Meetings (TSMs) and Working Group Meetings allowing Member State Competent Authorities to discuss issues arising related to implementation of Directives.

== ESIS ==
The European chemical Substances Information System (ESIS) is an IT system that provides information on chemicals in different lists. The ESIS database includes the following elements (please note that since 2008, the databases marked with ++ have been taken over by the European Chemicals Agency (ECHA), which will also ensure further updates):

- EINECS (European Inventory of Existing Commercial chemical Substances);
- ++ELINCS (European List of Notified Chemical Substances);
- NLP (No-Longer Polymers);
- BPD (Biocidal Products Directive) active substances;
- ++PBT (Persistent, bioaccumulative, and toxic) or vPvB (very Persistent and very Bioaccumulative);
- ++CLP/GHS (Classification, Labelling and Packaging of substances and mixtures), CLP implements the Globally harmonised System (GHS);
- ++HPVCs (High Production Volume Chemicals) and LPVCs (Low Production Volume Chemicals), including EU Producers/Importers lists;
- ++IUCLID Chemical Data Sheets, OECD-IUCLID Export Files, EUSES Export Files;
- ++Priority Lists, Risk Assessment process and tracking system in relation to Council Regulation (EEC) 793/93 also known as Existing Substances Regulation (ESR).

== See also ==
- REACH
- IUCLID
- BPD
