= European Union System for the Evaluation of Substances =

The European Union System for the Evaluation of Substances (EUSES) is a mathematical model for calculation of Predicted Environmental Concentrations (PEC) and human exposure. It may be used in Chemical Safety Assessments (CSA) and be cited in Chemical Safety Reports (CSR).

EUSES is provided free of charge from the European Chemical Bureau website and has the form of a Microsoft Excel sheet.
