= National Chemical Emergency Centre =

Coordinates: 51.577428°N 1.306952°W

National Chemical Emergency Centre (NCEC)
- Type: Division
- Industry: Chemical industry information
- Founder: UK Government
- Headquarters: Harwell, Didcot, UK
- Parent: WSP Global
- Website: [http://WSP Global wsp global]

The National Chemical Emergency Centre (NCEC) is a former UK government agency, now privately owned as part of WSP, who acquired Ricardo plc, providing information related to chemical accidents (spillages and fires) to emergency services in the United Kingdom and other countries.

The NCEC is headquartered on the Harwell Science and Innovation Campus in the Vale of White Horse in Oxfordshire.

== History ==
The NCEC was formed in 1973 as a government agency. On 1 March 1979 the Centre launched, in cooperation with the Home Office, its Hazfile computer database, made available to fifteen British fire services, listing over 10,000 chemical compounds; this was later replaced by the Chemdata system. A similar system in the USA is called RTECS (Registry of Toxic Effects of Chemical Substances).

== Function ==
Most chemical safety legislation in the UK covers the transport of hazardous chemicals by road. Companies carrying dangerous substances must comply with the legislation. The NCEC worked with the European Chemical Industry Council (CEFIC) to develop a set of safety codes for carrying dangerous chemicals for National Intervention in Chemical Transport Emergencies Centres across Europe.

=== Chemdata ===
In the 1980s the NCEC developed the Chemdata hazardous material database, which was provided to British fire services for use in case of chemical accidents.

Chemdata lists over 61,600 safety data sheets (SDS) for dangerous substances. It is published in six languages.

== See also ==
- European chemical Substances Information System (ESIS) and European Chemicals Agency
- History of fire safety legislation in the United Kingdom
- International Maritime Dangerous Goods Code, developed by the London-based International Maritime Organization (IMO)
- National Poisons Information Service (NPIS), provides much the same function, but for pharmaceutical products
