= C13H21N =

The molecular formula C_{13}H_{21}N may refer to:

- Butylamphetamine
- 2,6-Di-tert-butylpyridine
