= Eurospares =

British automotive parts company

- Trade name: EUROSPARES (CONTINENTAL PARTS) LIMITED
- Industry: Auto Parts Store
- Founded: 1985; 41 years ago in Halstead, Essex, England
- Founder: Vincent Pumo
- Headquarters: Halstead, Essex, United Kingdom
- Key people: James Pumo
- Website: eurospares.co.uk

Eurospares is a British company specialising in selling new and used Ferrari, Maserati, Lamborghini, and Aston Martin spare parts worldwide. Established in 1985 in Halstead, Essex, England, Eurospares supplies parts for these luxury automotive brands and maintains an online catalogue of technical part diagrams. Eurospares also sponsors race cars and race car drivers.

Eurospares has been featured in multiple documentaries and publications including Scrap Kings, Motorvision International and Auto Car.

== History ==
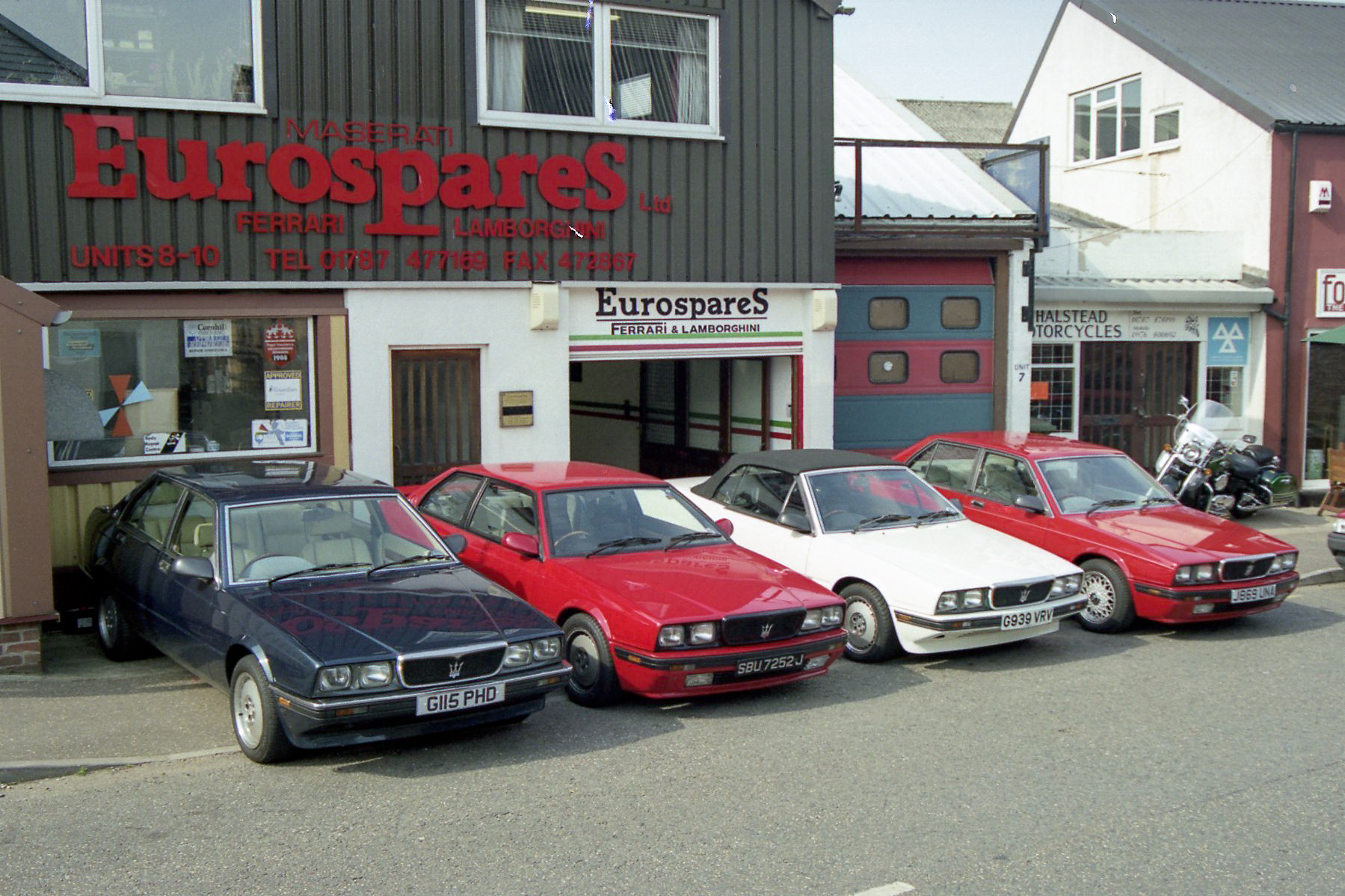
Eurospares original location in Halstead.

Eurospares was founded by Vincent Pumo, (father of current owner James Pumo), a native Sicilian living in Manchester, England. During a trip to Italy, a Ferrari dealer asked him to pick up some parts from the factory. This became a regular occurrence and over time Vincent built up knowledge and contacts in the parts industry and formed Eurospares Continental Ltd in 1985. Initially, the company repaired cars and sold spare parts. However, in the early 2000s, Eurospares shifted its focus solely to supplying parts.

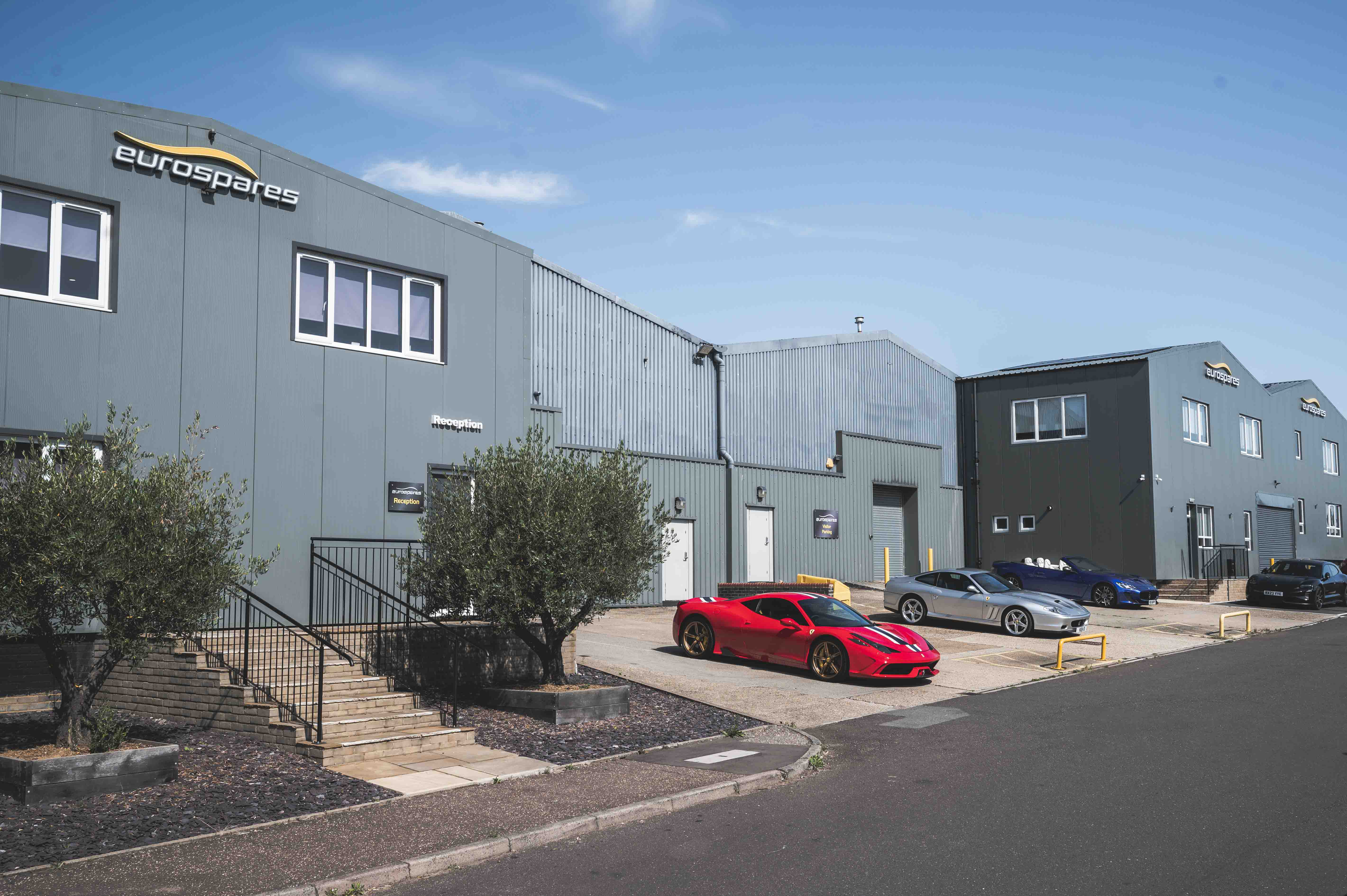
Current Eurospares offices and warehouses in Bluebridge Industrial Estate

== Recycling and dismantling ==
Eurospares is engaged in the dismantling and salvaging of approximately 30-40 accident-damaged supercars each year. Their on-site workshop parts out "end of life vehicles", ensuring that each component is tested and catalogued according to manufacturer part number.

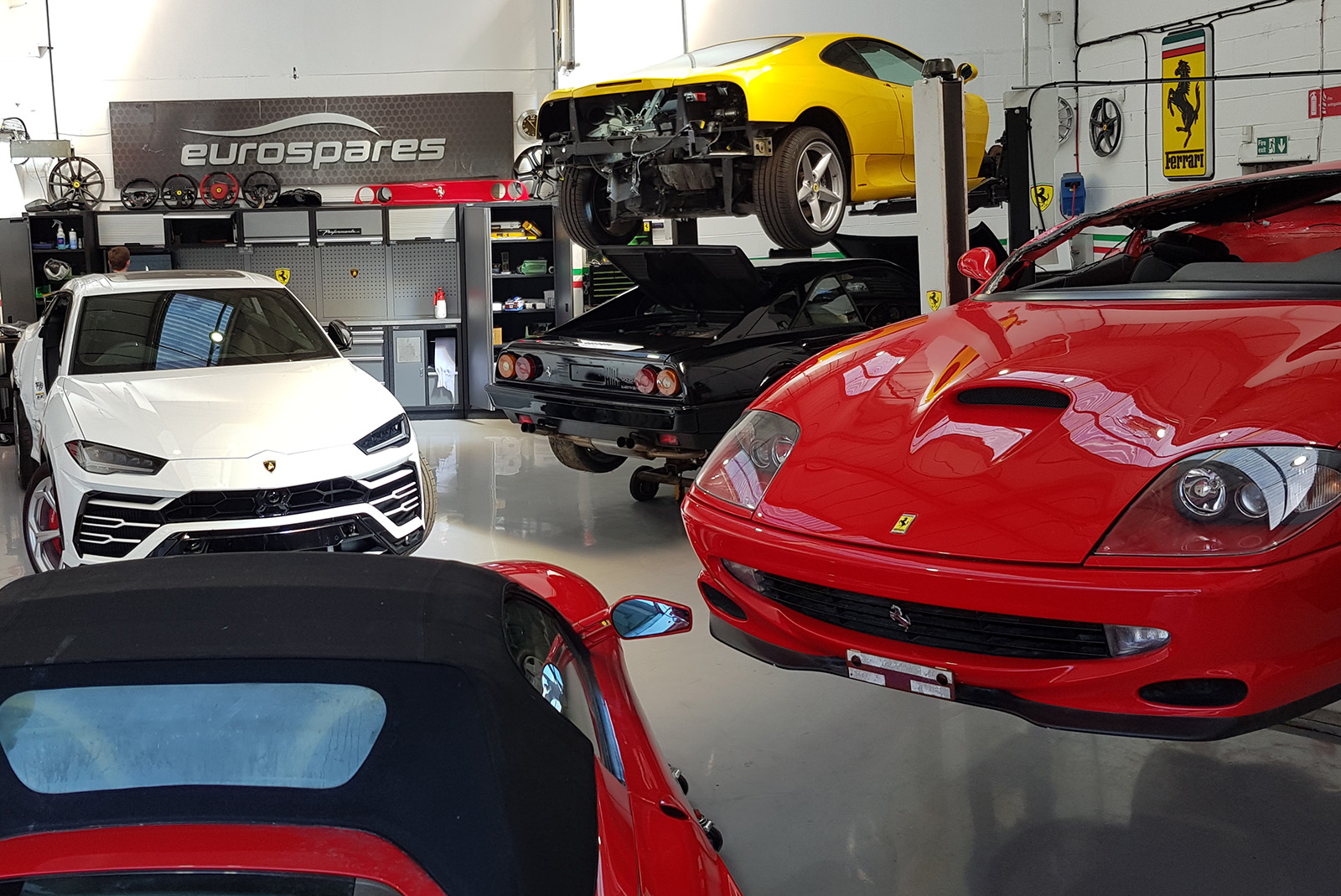
Inside the Eurospares cars dismantling workshop.

Eurospares has dismantled over 270 exotic cars. These have included a Ferrari Dino GTS, Lamborghini Countach, Ferrari 488 Pista, Ferrari 360 Challenge Stradale, and a Ferrari 430 Scuderia 16m.

== Motorsport and sponsorship ==
Eurospares has worked with and sponsored prominent figures in Motorsport. In 2015 James Pumo worked alongside Thomas Erdos for the British GT Championship. In the GTC series Eurospares Racing ran a Ferrari 458 Challenge and a Lamborghini Super Trofeo.

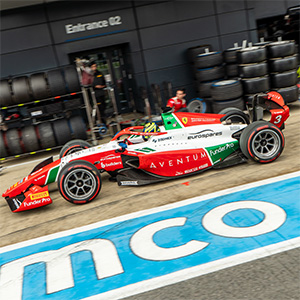
Oliver Bearman, Silverstone, July 2024 racing for Prema in FIA Formula 2

In 2017, Eurospares sponsored Charles Leclerc and Antonio Fuoco in Formula 2 for the Prema Racing Team. Charles went on to win the Formula 2 championship that same year.

In 2019, Eurospares began sponsoring Mick Schumacher, son of the legendary Michael Schumacher, who has since achieved success in Formula 2 racing.

In 2024, Eurospares sponsored Scuderia Ferrari Driving Academy driver Oliver Bearman throughout his Formula 2 season.

In 2025, Eurospares sponsored Formula One driver Oliver Bearman while he competed for Haas F1.
