= Substitution principle =

Substitution principle can refer to several things:

- Substitution principle (mathematics)
- Substitution principle (sustainability)
- Liskov substitution principle (computer science)
