= NCEC =

NCEC may refer to:

- National Chemical Emergency Centre
- National Committee for an Effective Congress
