= European chemical Substances Information System =

Chemoinformatics database

The European chemical Substances Information System (ESIS) was a chemoinformatics database that stored information system on chemicals of the European Union. It was created in the year 2003 by the former European Chemicals Bureau, which completed its mandate in 2008. ESIS was set up by the Joint Research Centre of the European Commission in order to make data on the safety of chemicals more readily accessible to the public, offering a single search tool on chemicals and the legislation under which they are presently covered. By October 3, 2013, ESIS contained 14,897 substance records.

ESIS provided access to several registers and lists, shown below:

- EINECS (European Inventory of Existing Commercial chemical Substances)
- NLP (No-Longer Polymers)
- BPD (Biocidal Products Directive)
- Export and Import of Dangerous Chemicals

The following databases were originally part of ESIS, but have been taken over by the European Chemicals Agency (ECHA), which will also ensure further updates:

- ELINCS (European List of Notified Chemical Substances)
- PBT (Persistent, bioaccumulative and toxic)
- C&L (Classification and Labelling)
- HPVCs (High Production Volume Chemicals) and LPVCs (Low Production Volume Chemicals)
- IUCLID Chemical Data Sheets
- Priority Lists, Risk Assessment process and tracking system
