= Measured environmental concentration =

A measured environmental concentration (MEC) is the amount of a chemical substance found in an environmental sample. The concentration of the compound may result from direct contamination, the transformation or metabolization of a different chemical contaminant, natural origin, or a combination of these sources.

MEC is to be used as a reference in the context of Chemical Safety Assessments (CSA) and should be compared with the respective Predicted Environmental Concentration (PEC) and Predicted No-Effect Concentration (PNEC) in order to decide whether exposure model is valid and the compound related risk is controlled.

The formula:

Risk = (Measured environmental concentration)/(Predicted no-effect concentration)

is used to calculate risk information.
