= 2,4,6-Tri-tert-butylpyrimidine =

Names
- Preferred IUPAC name 2,4,6-Tri-tert-butylpyrimidine

Identifiers
CAS Number	67490-21-5
3D model (JSmol)	Interactive image
ChemSpider	2682941
ECHA InfoCard	100.156.924
EC Number	628-674-7
PubChem CID	3440137
CompTox Dashboard (EPA)	DTXSID20392494
- InChI: InChI=1S/C16H28N2/c1-14(2,3)11-10-12(15(4,5)6)18-13(17-11)16(7,8)9/h10H,1-9H3 Key: VYWSYEDVFVGRGG-UHFFFAOYSA-N
- SMILES: CC(C)(C)C1=CC(=NC(=N1)C(C)(C)C)C(C)(C)C

Properties
Chemical formula	C_{16}H_{28}N_{2}
Molar mass	248.414 g·mol^{−1}
Appearance	White or colorless solid
Melting point	77–78 °C (171–172 °F; 350–351 K)
- Except where otherwise noted, data are given for materials in their standard state (at 25 °C [77 °F], 100 kPa). Infobox references

2,4,6-Tri-tert-butylpyrimidine is the organic compound with the formula HC(Bu^{t}C)_{2}N_{2}C^{t}Bu where ^{t}Bu = (CH_{3})_{3}C. It is a substituted derivative of the heterocycle pyrimidine. Known also as TTBP, this compound is of interest as a base that is sufficiently bulky to not bind boron trifluoride but still able to bind protons. It is less expensive that the related bulky derivatives of pyridine such as 2,6-di-tert-butylpyridine, 2,4,6-tri-tert-butylpyridine, and 2,6-di-tert-butyl-4-methylpyridine.
