= International Material Data System =

Data repository used in automotive industry

The International Material Data System (IMDS) is a computer-based system used by the automotive industry to collect and manage information about the materials and substances contained in vehicle parts. It was created in 1999 through a collaboration involving Audi, BMW, Daimler, EDS (now part of DXC Technology), Ford, Opel, Porsche, Volkswagen, and Volvo. Participation has since expanded to additional vehicle manufacturers and suppliers.

IMDS is used to identify and trace hazardous or regulated substances by comparing submitted material data with regulatory lists and requirements, including the Global Automotive Declarable Substance List (GADSL), REACH, and the End-of-Life Vehicles Directive. Suppliers submit information about the parts they provide to their direct customers, allowing material data to pass through the automotive supply chain and enabling manufacturers to trace substances to individual components. The basic web version of IMDS is available to automotive suppliers without charge, while third-party systems provide additional integration and reporting functions.

== Introduction ==
The IMDS was originally created in 1999 as a collaboration of Audi, BMW, Daimler, EDS (now part of DXC Technology, the system administrator), Ford, Opel, Porsche, VW and Volvo. Since inception the list of participating vehicle manufacturers and suppliers has grown greatly.

== Usage ==
Because it is a computer-based system, IMDS highlights hazardous and controlled substances by comparing entered data with regulatory-originated lists of prohibited substances (GADSL, REACH, ELV, etc...). Hence OEMs can trace hazardous substances back to the individual part and work with suppliers to reduce, control, or eliminate the hazard.

All substances must be declared in the material data sheet (MDS) of the IMDS to a resolution of 1 gram or better – not just declarable and prohibited substances (e.g. Cr VI / Hg / Pb / Cd). Substances and materials of products must be known in detail so that it may be delivered by the OEMs to dismantler companies in order to achieve the goals of the ELV Directive.

The basic workflow model of the system is for each supplier to submit data about the parts they sell to their direct customer. When each link in the supply chain submits data per this method, it mimics actual supply chain part flow, preserving customer-to-supplier relations. Data entry in IMDS is frequently a contractual requirement of PPAP which is one part of standard automotive quality systems.

== Access and costs ==
The IMDS is easily accessed through the internet. The basic web browser version of the system is supported by the OEM sponsor's group and provided free of charge to suppliers in the automotive supply chain.

There are several vendors that provide systems allowing compatible IMDS interaction with product lifecycle management, download and upload, data format translation, and other reporting systems.

== Changes in 2013 and 2014 ==
- 2013 – IMDS NT for Design Changes
- 2014 – IMDS 2020 for New Functions
