= 2,6-Di-tert-butylpyridine =

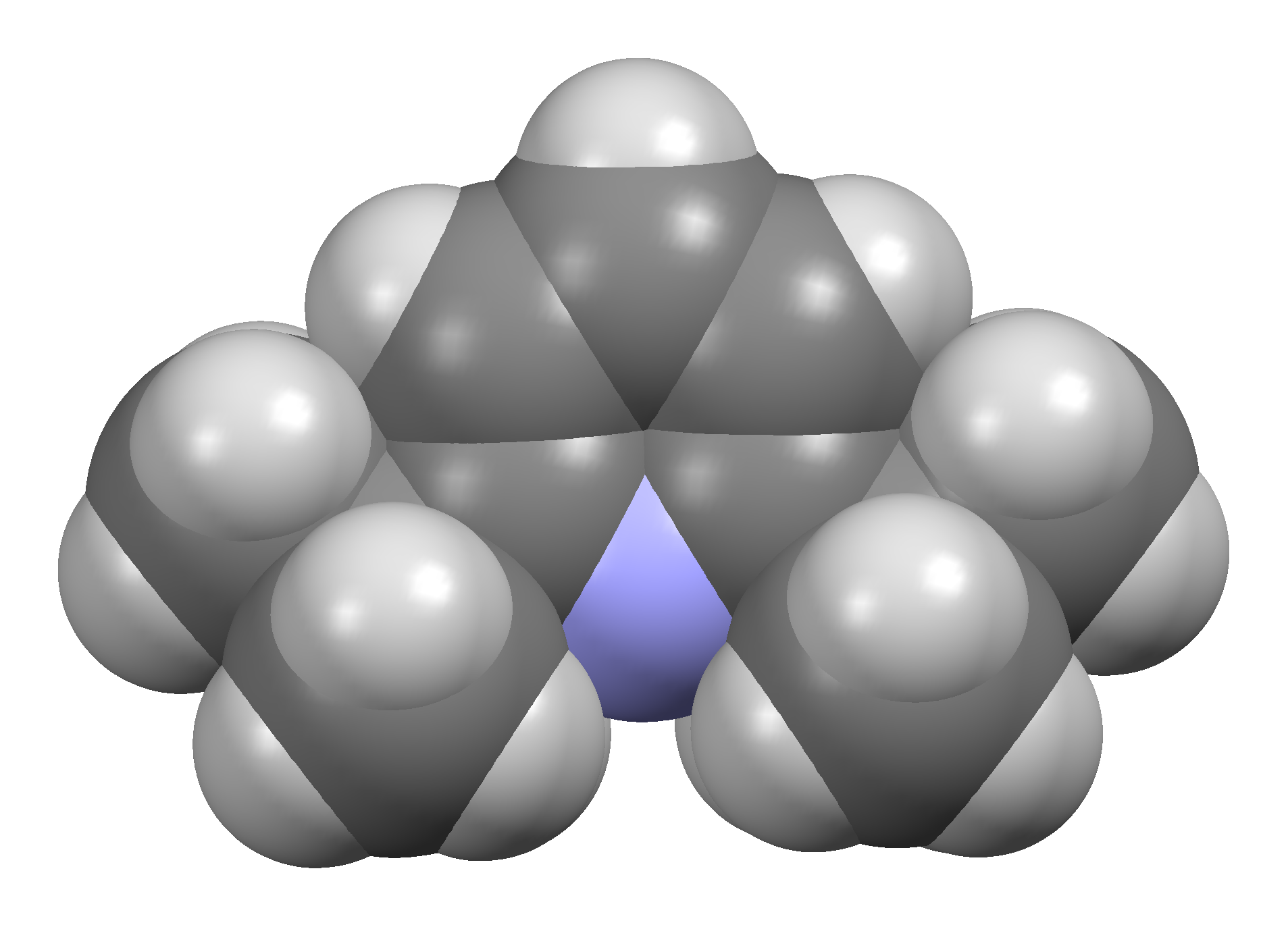

Names
- Preferred IUPAC name 2,6-Di-tert-butylpyridine
- Other names Dibutylpyridine

Identifiers
CAS Number	585-48-8
3D model (JSmol)	Interactive image
ChemSpider	61785
ECHA InfoCard	100.008.690
PubChem CID	68510
UNII	OI9LF0H4MM
CompTox Dashboard (EPA)	DTXSID80207217
- InChI: InChI=1S/C13H21N/c1-12(2,3)10-8-7-9-11(14-10)13(4,5)6/h7-9H,1-6H3 Key: UWKQJZCTQGMHKD-UHFFFAOYSA-N; InChI=1/C13H21N/c1-12(2,3)10-8-7-9-11(14-10)13(4,5)6/h7-9H,1-6H3 Key: UWKQJZCTQGMHKD-UHFFFAOYAA
- SMILES: n1c(cccc1C(C)(C)C)C(C)(C)C

Properties
Chemical formula	C_{13}H_{21}N
Molar mass	191.3125
Appearance	colourless liquid
Density	0.885 g/cm^{3}

Hazards
Flash point	72.2 °C (162.0 °F; 345.3 K)
- Except where otherwise noted, data are given for materials in their standard state (at 25 °C [77 °F], 100 kPa). verify (what is ?) Infobox references

2,6-Di-tert-butylpyridine is an organic compound with the formula (Me_{3}C)_{2}C_{5}H_{3}N. This colourless, oily liquid is derived from pyridine by replacement of the two H atoms with tert-butyl groups. It is a hindered base. For example, it can be protonated, but it does not form an adduct with boron trifluoride.

== Preparation ==
2,6-Di-tert-butylpyridine is prepared by the reaction of tert-butyllithium with pyridine. The synthesis is reminiscent of the Chichibabin reaction.

Some related bulky pyridine compounds have been described, including 2,4,6-tri-t-butylpyridine and 2,6-di-tert-butyl-4-methylpyridine.

== See also ==
- 2,4,6-Tri-tert-butylpyrimidine, a bulky base that is less expensive than the tert-butylpyridines
