= Chemical safety =

Safety of activities involving chemicals

Chemical safety includes all safety policies, procedures and practices designed to minimize the risk of exposure to potentially hazardous chemicals. This includes the risks of exposure to persons handling the chemicals, to the surrounding environment, and to the communities and ecosystems within that environment. Manufactured chemicals, either pure or in mixtures, solutions and emulsions, are ubiquitous in modern society, at industrial, occupational and private scale. However, there are chemicals that should not mix or get in contact with others, as they can produce byproducts that may be toxic, carcinogenic, explosive etc., or can be dangerous in themselves. To avoid disasters and mishaps, maintaining safety is paramount.

Chemical safety refers to safety issues surrounding the use, production, transport and handling of chemicals at large or small manufacturing facilities, laboratories, non-chemical sites that use manufactured chemicals for their business, or homes during everyday activities. While there is some overlap, it is different from process safety, which is concerned with more than just hazardous chemicals (extending for example to refined and unrefined hydrocarbons). Process safety is specific to industrial process plants, and focuses primarily on major accidents rather than both immediate and long-term effects (such as chemical carcinogenity).

The hazardous nature of many chemicals may be increased when mixed with other chemicals, heated or handled inappropriately. In a chemically safe environment, users are able to take appropriate actions in case of accidents, although many incidents of exposure to chemical hazards occur outside controlled environments such as manufacturing plants or laboratories.

It is estimated that 1.6 million human deaths occur each year from contact with hazardous chemicals and that in 2016, 45 million disability-adjusted life-years were lost, a significant increase from 2012.

== Risks and hazards ==
Chemicals in use in industry and research have a range of properties which cause them to be hazardous to life. These include explosiveness, flammability, toxicity, carcinogenicity and teratogenicity. Corrosive substances such as strong alkalis or acids can cause chemical burning. Any one chemical or mixture may exhibit several of these properties.

Toxic materials may be solids in powdered or finely divided form, liquids and gases. Any of these materials may all be absorbed by inhalation, directly through the skin of by contact with mucous membranes in the nose or eyes. Some chemicals may persist in the body for substantial periods and can continue to exhibit toxicity. Examples of such materials include mercury, arsenic, dioxins, and many organic solvents which can be stored in fat cells.

Environmental risks may be difficult to evaluate and may take years to become apparent. The risk to the Earth's ozone layer from the release of CFCs required the investigative powers of scientists throughout the world to understand fully. Science is still working out the seriousness of the effects of persistent halogenated organics on the marine food chain, with some of these chemicals becoming concentrated in the fatty deposits of top predators in concentrations that appear to effect their reproductive success.

== Management and control ==
The management and control of chemical safety is widely developed through primary legislation, and orders derived from such legislation in the western world and in Australasia. The implementation of such legislation follows a variety of patterns, from the European model of detailed directives and orders implemented through country-specific legislation to the US model of wide-ranging federal enactments. The control of this is divided between State legislation and federal government. Examples from these areas are described below.

=== European Union ===
The Chemicals Agents Directive, a daughter directive of Directive 89/391/EEC, provides the framework for managing chemical safety. The European Chemicals Agency is the responsible agency and specifically implements Registration, Evaluation, Authorisation and Restriction of Chemicals (REACH), sets the standards and ensures compliance across the European Union. The European Chemicals Agency sits under REACH and manages the technical and administrative aspects of the implementation of the Directive.

=== New Zealand ===
The administrative framework is based on Health and Safety at Work (Hazardous Substances) Regulations 2017 and is implemented and enforced by Worksafe, a government agency. Although this legislation is comprehensive in its coverage it does not extend beyond the workplace and imposes no duties or responsibilities in regard to hazardous materials in domestic or educational establishments.

=== United Kingdom ===
In the UK legislation to address chemical safety has been incorporated in many pieces of legislation from the early factories acts onwards. The current Health and Safety at Work etc. Act 1974 provided an all encompassing piece of legislation which covered chemical safety amongst a wide range of other measures designed to improve the safety in the workplace in the UK.

Enforcement of chemical safety is the responsibility of the Health and Safety Executive (HSE), which implements relevant sections of the Health and Safety at Work etc. Act 1974, formulates regulations, provides safety advice and guidance and investigates major chemical incidents.

=== United States ===
In the US, the U.S. Chemical Safety and Hazard Investigation Board is responsible for investigating major chemical accidents and making recommendations to mitigate such events in the future.

== Risk areas ==
=== Manufacturing ===
The manufacture and purification of chemicals can involve a range of reagents which may themselves be hazardous, and a range of products which equally may be hazardous. For example, in order to produce the herbicide 2,4,5-Trichlorophenol, chlorine, an acutely toxic gas, is reacted with phenol, a hazardous organic liquid. The output is typically a mixture of chlorinated organic compounds, only some of which is the desired product. In this example, contaminants can include 2,3,7,8-tetrachlorodibenzodioxin, a dioxin, one of the most toxic synthetic chemicals known which is both acutely and chronically toxic and teratogenic and whose use on one occasion led to the abandonment of the Times Beach, Missouri. This reaction was also the cause of the infamous Bhopal disaster, during which the highly poisonous gas methyl isocyanate was released.

Major chemical accidents (and events that have the potential to escalate to major accidents) are covered in the specialized domain of process safety.

=== Laboratories ===
Laboratories in schools, university, research establishments and manufacturing typically store and handle a wide range of chemicals. Safety standards for such areas are high and most laboratories provide specific infrastructure to minimise risk including fume cupboards, impervious and inert work surfaces, emergency shower stations, emergency eye wash stations, and strict policies on the wearing of appropriate PPE.

=== Domestic use ===
There are many hazardous chemicals in routine use in the domestic environment including cleaning agents such as bleach and caustic soda. Some modern cleaning formulations also contain sodium silicate and other highly alkaline components. Modern packaging into "pods" may increase the risk of misuse, particularly for small children.

=== Waste disposal ===
Surplus hazardous materials often reach the waste stream, whether by being placed in the solid waste stream or being flushed away down sinks, basins or toilets. Although dilution may reduce the immediate risk, the long term environmental risk remains and can be made more serious as more hazardous materials are disposed of in the waste water stream. Disposal with solid waste poses risks to those handling the waste and may pose unexpected risks to uninformed members of the public. Some industrial waste chemical dumps have been known to spontaneously ignite, years after the waste had been deposited. Aluminium dross processing can produce a flux-rich waste that evolves ammonia gas if wetted, and can also spontaneously ignite when stored in bulk.

== Common safety practices ==
=== Personal protective equipment (PPE) ===
Basic chemical safety practice includes wearing protective personal protective equipment such as safety goggles. Personal protective equipment alone does not provide sufficient protection from the risks posed by hazardous chemicals but it helps minimize the risk of exposure in controlled environments. Safety googles are required when handling chemicals to prevent chemicals from getting into the eyes. Wearing standard gloves, closed-toed shoes, long trousers, and laboratory coats to protect the stomach, back and forearm is usually required in laboratories, with similar provisions for other workplaces. Regulation of use of PPE is varies by country.

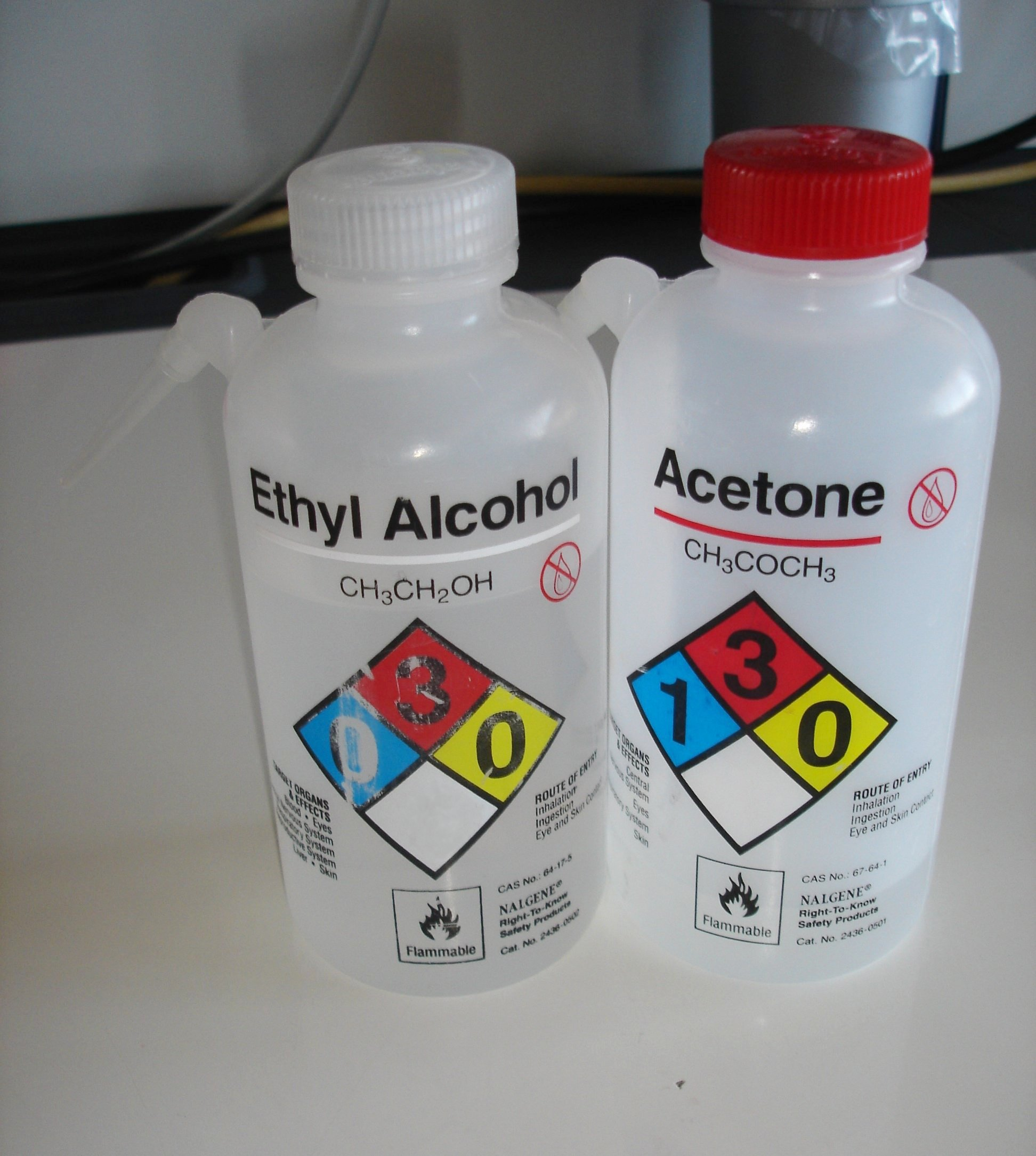
NFPA diamond shown on ethanol and acetone bottles

=== Labelling ===
For most of the world, a standard set of illustrative pictograms have been adopted to indicate where hazards exists and the type of hazard present. These pictograms are routinely displayed on containers, transport vehicles, safety advice and anywhere where the material occurs. These have been extended and standardized as the Globally Harmonized System of Classification and Labelling of Chemicals and are now used throughout much of the world.

In the U.S., an NFPA diamond is used to identify chemical hazards such as flammability, corrosivity, toxicity, and reactivity. This label is made up of four colour-coded fields: red (flammability), blue (health hazard), yellow (chemical reactivity), and white (special hazard). The numbering ranges from 0 to 4 (for colours except white), with 0 meaning there is no potential hazard and 4 indicating the chemical is extremely hazardous.

=== Safety Data Sheets (SDSs) ===
Manufacturers provide a safety data sheet (SDS; previously called 'material safety data sheet', MSDS) for each hazardous chemical they produce. SDSs are typically used and affixed by regulation at worksites handling those chemicals. An SDS includes workplace health aspects, restrictions, emergency numbers, and other safety information.

=== Transportation ===
In a number of countries, the Hazchem system is used whenever a potentially hazardous cargo is transported whether by road, rail, sea or air. A standardized Hazchem sign affixed on the vehicle provides details of the material being transported, the nature of the hazard and the approved emergency response.

== See also ==
- Chemical accident
- Chemical protective clothing
- Chemical safety assessment
- Occupational safety and health
- Process safety
