= Test Methods Regulation =

Regulation (EC) No 440/2008
- European Union regulation
- Title: Council Regulation (EC) No 440/2008 of 30 May 2008 laying down test methods pursuant to Regulation (EC) No 1907/2006 of the European Parliament and of the Council on the Registration, Evaluation, Authorisation and Restriction of Chemicals (REACH)
- Made by: European Parliament and Council
- Journal reference: [32008R0440 ]

The Test Methods Regulation is a Regulation (European Union) No. 440/2008 of May 30, 2008. It, and its subsequent amendments, define tests, testing of chemicals for the REACH Regulation. They are based on the OECD Guidelines for the Testing of Chemicals.
