= EU Chemicals Strategy for Sustainability Towards a Toxic-Free Environment =

The EU's Chemicals Strategy for Sustainability Towards a Toxic-Free Environment is a strategy published in 2020 that is part of the EU's zero pollution ambition, a key commitment of the European Green Deal.

innovation for the green transition of the chemical industry and its value chains must be stepped up and the existing EU chemicals policy must evolve and respond more rapidly and effectively to the challenges posed by hazardous chemicals.

— EC, 2020

== See also ==
- Registration, Evaluation, Authorisation and Restriction of Chemicals
