= Biocidal Products Directive =

The Biocidal Products Directive (BPD) also known as the Biocides Directive is European Union Directive, (98/8/EC), which concerns biocides. It is officially known as Directive 98/8/EC of the European Parliament and of the Council of 16 February 1998 concerning the placing of biocidal products on the market. In 2013 the Biocidal Products Directive was superseded by The Biocidal Products Regulation (BPR, Regulation (EU) 528/2012).

== Definition ==
Biocide is defined in Article 2(1)(a) as "active substances and preparations containing one or more active substances, put up in the form in which they are supplied to the user, intended to destroy, deter, render harmless, prevent the action of, or otherwise exert a controlling effect on any harmful organism by chemical or biological means."

A biocidal product is a substance intending to destroy, deter, render harmless, prevent the action of, or exert a controlling effect on any harmful organism by any means other than mere physical or mechanical action. These products are highly regulated because of health and performance concerns. They first have to be legally regulated, and all products or substances on the market also have to be tested and certified in order to ensure their compliance with current directives and regulations.

The definition and the identification of the biocidal products, including their classifications, are crucial because they form the bases of the guidance documents and these also allow the systematic and easier association with the appropriate governing framework. For instance, those substances classified in the directive as cosmetics products immediately fall within the coverage of the Cosmetics Products Regulation 1223/2009.

== EU biocides regulation ==
Biocidal products and active substances fall into four categories and twenty-three product-types that are all regulated by the EU under the Biocidal Products Directive. The substances have to be authorised before being used or sold on the EU market. Also, all treated products shall only contain authorised active substances. To be authorised, manufacturers or importers need to submit technical documentation on the products. The European Commission created and regularly updates the Biocidal Products Directive to ensure a high level of protection of human and animal health, as well as environmental protection.

A proposal (COM(2009)267) was put forward to repeal and replace the Directive 98/8/EC and it was adopted on June 12, 2009, by the European Commission. This proposed measure builds on the principles of the older directive, with the aim of improving "the functioning of the internal market in biocidal products while maintaining a high level of environmental and human health protection."

== Classification ==
The biocides are classified in Annex V:

Main group 1: Disinfectants and general biocidal products

- Product-type 1: Human hygiene biocidal products
- Product-type 2: Private area and public health area disinfectants and other biocidal products
- Product-type 3: Veterinary hygiene biocidal products
- Product-type 4: Food and feed area disinfectants
- Product-type 5: Drinking water disinfectants

Main group 2: Preservatives

- Product-type 6: In-can preservatives
- Product-type 7: Film preservatives
- Product-type 8: Wood preservatives
- Product-type 9: Fibre, leather, rubber and polymerised materials preservatives
- Product-type 10: Masonry preservatives
- Product-type 11: Preservatives for liquid-cooling and processing systems
- Product-type 12: Slimicides
- Product-type 13: Metalworking-fluid preservatives

Main group 3: Pest control

- Product-type 14: Rodenticides
- Product-type 15: Avicides
- Product-type 16: Molluscicides
- Product-type 17: Piscicides
- Product-type 18: Insecticides, acaricides and products to control other arthropods
- Product-type 19: Repellents and attractants

Main group 4: Other biocidal products

- Product-type 20: Preservatives for food or feedstocks
- Product-type 21: Antifouling products
- Product-type 22: Embalming and taxidermist fluids
- Product-type 23: Control of other vertebrates
