= End of Life Vehicles Directive =

2000 European Union directive

The End of Life Vehicles Directive is a Directive of the European Union addressing the end of life for automotive products. Every year, motor vehicles which have reached the end of their useful lives create between 8 and 9 million tonnes of waste in the European Union. In 1997, the European Commission adopted a Proposal for a Directive to tackle this problem.

== Legal background ==
The Directive on End-of-Life Vehicles 2000/53/EC is the first EU waste directive with which the EU Commission has introduced the concept of extended producer responsibility. The directive aims at reduction of waste arising from end-of-life vehicles.

The scope of the directive covers passenger cars classified as M1, light commercial vehicles classified as N1 (Definition for M1 and N1 in Regulation (EU) 2018/858 on the approval and market surveillance of motor vehicles and their trailers) and three-wheel motor vehicles as defined in Directive 92/61/EEC but excludes motor tricycles. In its frequently asked questions chapter, the ELV Guidance Document clarifies that motor caravans are in scope. Other vehicles, such as buses with more than 9 seats, motorcycles, commercial vehicles for the transport of goods with a maximum mass of more than 3.5 tons, trailers and other vehicles (e.g. trains, boats, and airplanes) are not covered by the ELV Directive.

The directive covers aspects along the life cycle of a vehicle as well as aspects related to treatment operations. As such it aims at:

- preventing the use of certain heavy metals such as cadmium, lead, mercury and hexavalent chromium,
- collection of vehicles at suitable treatment facilities,
- de-pollution of fluids and specific components,
- coding and/or information on parts and components
- ensuring information for consumers and treatment organisations
- achieving reuse, recycling and recovery performance targets

With these targets set, the directive involves four major stakeholders, the producer, the recycling industry, the last holder and the authorities. Each has a responsibility within the realms of its unique possibility.

== Community waste legislation ==
Waste has become an important part of EU policy. A framework of different regulations and directives exist to improve the management of waste in the EU and EFTA countries. EU policy can be separated into product related regulation such as the ELV Directive, WEEE Directive or Battery Directive to only name a few, general waste legislation such as the Waste Framework Directive or Waste Shipment Regulation, and treatment related legislation e.g. Landfill Directive, Waste Incineration Directive. The product related waste regulation is subordinate to the general waste regulation. An important principle of product specific regulation is that a given product can not fall under the jurisdiction of two separate directives at the same time. For instance, the lead acid battery in an end-of-life vehicle is covered under the ELV Directive, whereas a lead-acid battery being a replacement part during life cycle of the vehicle is subject to the Battery Directive.

== Supervision of implementation ==
To a large degree European Union environmental policy is based on directives, which are only minimum requirements and allow for adaptation to the regulatory requirements and systems of the European member states. Thus, the transposition may differ slightly country by country around Europe. Once a given member state has written its national law, it notifies the EU Commission (EC) of its regulation. If a member state violates the provisions in its national transcription, the EU Commission may ask the authorities in the given member state to make the necessary changes. It could even launch an infringement procedure against the country. The member states had to implement the directive in two steps. While in the first step only vehicle registered after 1 July 2002 fell under the extended producer responsibility, the second step as of 1 January 2007 covered all vehicles a given producer has ever introduced in the market place. With implementation reports at regular intervals, the EU Commission is supervising the correct implementation of the ELV Directive in the markets of the EU. In 2018 the EC published a study Assessment of ELV Directive with emphasis on the end of life vehicles of unknown whereabouts. This study demonstrated that each year the whereabouts of 3 to 4 million ELVs across the EU is unknown and that the stipulations in the ELV directive are not sufficient to monitor the performance of individual member states. The study proposed and assessed a number of options to improve the legal provisions of the ELV directive.

== European car fleet and replacement ==
Europe's number of motor vehicles in use is among the largest in the world. In 2006, the total number of motor vehicles was 263M units of which passenger cars were largest group with 230M units. With an annual new registration of 18.7M units in total and 15.9M units of passenger cars the estimated annual volume of de-registrations is in the size of 13M to 14M units. However, official statistics only account for approximately 7M units as the official number of scrapped vehicles. The difference in number is usually traded as a commodity product i.e. as a used car to market such as East Europe and Africa.

== Elements of the ELV Directive ==
=== Prevention ===
The concept of prevention is based on four pillars.

1. The aim is the reduction of hazardous substances in vehicles to minimise their release to the environment.
2. Vehicles should be designed to facilitate proper dismantling and to allow components and materials to be reused, recycled and/or recovered.
3. The producers (both vehicle and component) shall increase the demand for recycled material.
4. Certain materials (lead, mercury, cadmium, hexavalent chromium) are forbidden except for a few applications with defined phase-out dates.

These exemptions are catalogued in the Annex II to the ELV Directive. Since technology is subject to constant change, the Annex II is revised on a regular basis to account for new technical developments making certain materials in specific applications no longer necessary or allow for reduction of thresholds. As of today, 5 revisions have already been conducted with revision 6 under preparation.

=== Material coding ===
Materials and components, which are either classified hazardous and thus shall not be released to the environment or should be dismantled to facilitate recycling, need to be coded for easier identification by treatment facilities. Well known ISO standards are to be applied for marking purposes.

=== Treatment obligation ===
With the advent of the ELV Directive, requirements for the physical treatment of vehicles and ubiquitous prerequisites for treatment facilities were introduced by drafting the Annex I to the ELV Directive as an enclosure. Annex I describes minimum technical requirements any treatment facility need to adhere to. These are standards on buildings, premises and installations primarily designed to avoid fluids to be released to the soil. The second part covers the physical treatment procedure. Annex I distinguishes between operations for de-pollution and treatment operations to promote recycling. The first one, obligates treatment facilities to drain the ELV from all fluids, to remove components which are marked as being hazardous e.g. components identified to contain mercury, and explosive components e.g. seatbelt tensioners or air bags. The second one mandates the removal of certain components e.g. catalytic converter, tires, glass as well as other metal parts containing copper, aluminium or magnesium and large plastic components if these materials are not segregated in the shredding process.

=== Collection systems ===
For the consumer the primary focus of the ELV Directive is the responsibility of any given producer to take back the vehicles it has introduced on the market. The obligation does not mandate the producer to physically do it on his own, but rather allows for networks the producer can set up with various treatment companies or by joining a collective system. The collection systems need to fulfill the criteria of adequate area coverage. Typically, this is interpreted as being a 50 km radius around the take-back facility. Indispensable is the general mandate to arrange take-back at no cost to the last owner of the ELV, however, two exemptions are possible. If the vehicles lacks essential components or contains waste, the facility which takes the vehicle back is allowed to charge the last holder.

Vehicle manufacturer have established suitable collection systems in all markets in the EU and EFTA countries. While some markets favour collective systems, other markets have decided to allow own marque schemes. The first is characterised by one company organising the collection network on behalf of its members, typically the producers. The later is organised by the producer directly through bi-lateral relationships and contracts. Collective systems often go hand in hand with a deposit the first owner of a vehicle provides as collateral to be paid out when the vehicle is returned to a certified treatment facility at the end of its useful life. The other alternative is a fund system which requires either first owner or producer to pay a certain amount of money to. Fund money is not committed to vehicle return, but either used to finance other recycling projects or is even sunk in government budgets without any environmental impact or benefit.

=== Information ===
Vehicle recycling under such strict legal framework requires constant and palpable communication to stakeholders.

- Among them are the national environmental authorities who demand feedback on area coverage achieved. Any under performance would be notified immediately with a request to cover white spots.
- The second group concerns customers who want to know about the nearest take-back facility for delivery of the end-of-life vehicle at hand or are interested in a producer's environmental compliance or want to learn about vehicle recycling processes and solutions. Vehicle manufacturers or importing companies make this information available on their web pages.
- Finally, an important element of information is provided to treatment facilities. As the directive aims at prevention of waste, the treatment facilities need to have the knowledge about the components they need to separate from the vehicle to fulfil their share in the process. For that reason the automotive industry provides that information at no cost to the treatment facilities.

=== Quota monitoring ===
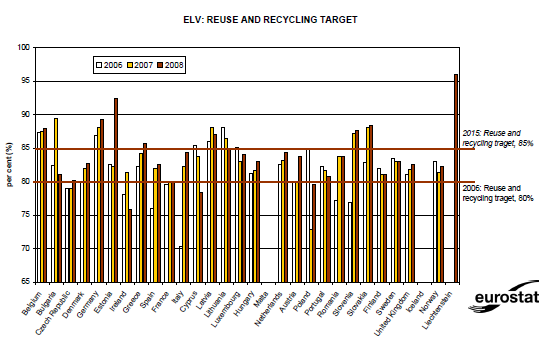
Reuse & Recycling Results

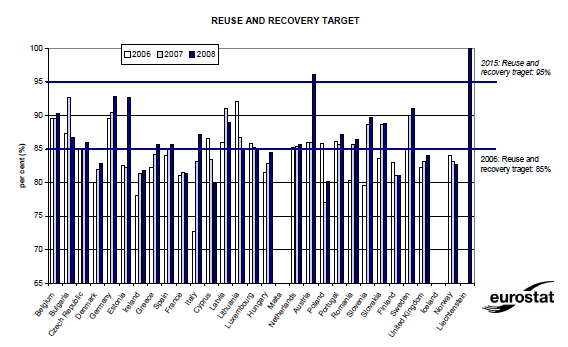
Reuse & Recovery Results

To measure the actual performance of the countries, targets were defined with the ELV Directive. The EU Member States and EFTA countries are obliged to ensure that economic operators (i.e. authorities, treatment operators and producers) as part of their shared responsibility meet certain minimum targets.

The targets are twofold:

	As of 1 January 2006	As of 1 January 2015
Reuse & Recycling	80%	85%
Reuse & Recovery	85%	95%

==== Calculation methodology ====
The targets are calculated based on the average weight of a single vehicle per year. While recycling is primarily defined as material processing with the aim of using the material for the same or for a similar purpose, recovery is defined as incineration to generate energy. Thus, the difference between the two targets reuse and recycling and reuse and recovery is the share which is incinerated. Member states have to report their annual performance to the EU Commission. Statistics for the quota achieved country by country and year by year are available at the Eurostat website.

== See also ==
- Vehicle recycling
- International Material Data System
- Phase-out_of_fossil_fuel_vehicles#Unintended side-effects
