= IUCLID =

Software application for chemical data

IUCLID (/ˈjuːklɪd/; International Uniform Chemical Information Database) is a software application to capture, store, maintain and exchange data on intrinsic and hazard properties of chemical substances. Distributed free of charge, the software is especially useful to chemical industry companies and to government authorities. It is the key tool for chemical industry to fulfill data submission obligations under REACH, the most important European Union legal document covering the production and use of chemical substances. The software is maintained by the European Chemicals Agency, ECHA. The latest version, version 6, was made available on 29 April 2016.

== History ==
=== IUCLID versions 1 to 4 ===
1993: First version of IUCLID for the European Existing Substances Regulation 793/93/EEC.

1999: IUCLID becomes the recommended tool for the OECD HPV Programme.

2000: IUCLID is the software prescribed in the EU Biocides legislation to notify existing active substances (Art. 4 of Commission Regulation (EC) No 1896/2000).

IUCLID 4 was used worldwide by about 500 organizations. These included chemical industry companies, EU Member State Competent Authorities, the OECD Secretariat, the US EPA, the Japan METI, and third-party service providers.

=== IUCLID 5 ===
In 2003, when it became clear that the REACH proposal would be adopted by the European Union, the European Commission decided to completely overhaul IUCLID 4 and to create a new version, IUCLID 5, which would be used by chemical industry companies to fulfill their data submission obligations under REACH. Migration of data in the IUCLID 4 format was supported by IUCLID 5.1. IUCLID 5.1 became available on 13 June 2007.

IUCLID is also mentioned in article 111 of the REACH of the REACH legislation as the format to be used for data collection and submission dossier preparation.

The following IUCLID 5 major versions have been released:

- IUCLID 5.0: 12 June 2007
- IUCLID 5.1: 16 January 2009
- IUCLID 5.2: 15 February 2010
- IUCLID 5.3: 24 February 2011
- IUCLID 5.4: 5 June 2012
- IUCLID 5.5: 2 April 2013
- IUCLID 5.6: 16 April 2014

== IUCLID 5 ==
=== Data Format and Exchange ===
Data that can be stored and maintained with IUCLID encompass information about:

- The party running IUCLID (production sites, contact persons etc.)
- The chemical substances managed by the company, namely their
  - identity, composition, and supporting analytical data
  - reference information like CAS number and other identifiers,
  - classification and labelling
  - physical/chemical properties,
  - toxicological properties,
  - eco-toxicological properties.

OECD and the European Commission have agreed on a standard XML format (OECD Harmonized Templates) in which these data are stored for easy data sharing. IUCLID 5 will be the first application fully implementing this international reporting standard, which has been accepted by many national and international regulatory authorities.

Numerous parties were involved in the creation and the review of the OECD Harmonized Templates, among them the Business and Industry Advisory Committee (BIAC) to the OECD, the European Chemical Industry Council (CEFIC) and other bodies and authorities.

IUCLID5 can be used to enter robust study summaries summarising toxicologically-relevant endpoints. A Klimisch score is assigned within robust study summary as one field.

=== Possible IUCLID 5 uses ===
Anyone can use a local IUCLID 5 installation to collect, store, maintain and exchange relevant data on chemical substances.

In addition to dossier creation for REACH, IUCLID 5 data can be (re-)used for a large number of other purposes, due to the compatibility of IUCLID 5 data with the OECD Harmonized Templates. The European Commission IUCLID project team and international authorities are currently in deliberation in order to further promote acceptance of IUCLID5 data in non-REACH jurisdictions. Legislations and programmes under which IUCLID 5 data are certainly accepted are:

- OECD Chemical Assessment Programme
- US HPV Challenge Programme
- Japan HPV Challenge Programme (provided OECD guidance for SIDS dossiers is followed there).

The IUCLID 5 data model also features Biocides/Pesticides elements. A dataset prepared for a substance under REACH can therefore be quickly complemented with data about possible biocidal or pesticidal properties and be re-used for data reporting obligations under the EU Biocides regulation.

The data are available and can be searched through the OECD eChemPortal.

=== Technology ===
==== IUCLID development and deployment ====
IUCLID 5 is a Java-based application, using the Hibernate framework for persistence. It features a Java Swing graphical user interface (GUI) and can be deployed on both single workstation and distributed environments.

IUCLID 5 offers the possibility to be deployed in:

- either a 100% open source system environment, using Tomcat as web container and PostgreSQL as Database Management System (DBMS),
- or a commercial system environment, using the Oracle WebLogic Server from Oracle Corporation as application server and/or Oracle as Database Management System (DBMS).

==== .i5z files ====
IUCLID 5 exports and imports files in the I5Z format. Files may be swapped between different IUCLID 5 installations and dossiers may be uploaded to ECHA via REACH-IT. I5Z stands for "IUCLID 5 Zip", as the file uses Zip file compression.

==== IUCLID 5 system requirements ====
IUCLID can be deployed on any current PC. For optimal performance, RAM should not be less than 1 GB.

=== IUCLID 6 ===
IUCLID 6 was made available on 24 June 2015 as a beta version so that large companies and other organisations could begin preparing their IT systems for the full release of IUCLID 6 in 2016. However, individual users and SMEs could also download the beta version to get a preview, and to become familiar with the user-interface.

The first official version of IUCLID 6 was published on 29 April 2016.

== See also ==
- European Chemicals Agency
- OECD
- European Commission
- REACH
- Institute for Health and Consumer Protection
- Joint Research Centre
