= European Community number =

Identifier for substance regulated within EU

The European Community number (EC number) is a unique seven-digit identifier that was assigned to substances for regulatory purposes within the European Union by the European Commission. The EC Inventory comprises three individual inventories, EINECS, ELINCS and the NLP list.

European Inventory of Existing Commercial Chemical Substances (EINECS)

== Structure ==
The EC number may be written in a general form as: NNN-NNN-R, where the N represents digits and R is a check digit. The check digit is calculated using the ISBN method. According to this method, the check digit R is the following sum modulo 11:

$$R = (N_1 + 2 N_2 + 3N_3 + 4N_4 + 5N_5 + 6N_6) \bmod 11$$

If the remainder R is equal to 10, that combination of digits is not used for an EC number. To illustrate, the EC number of dexamethasone is 200-003-9. N_{1} is 2, N_{2} through N_{5} are 0, and N_{6} is 3.

$$\frac{2 + 2\!\times\!0 + 3\!\times\!0 + 4\!\times\!0 + 5\!\times\!0 + 6\!\times\!3}{11} = \frac{20}{11} = 1 + \frac{9}{11}$$

The remainder is 9, which is the check digit.

There is a set of 181 ELINCS numbers (EC numbers starting with 4) for which the checksum by the above algorithm is 10 and the number has not been skipped but issued with a checksum of 1.

== EC Inventory ==
The EC Inventory includes the substances in the following inventories. The content of these inventories is fixed and official.

Inventory	Scope	Format	Number of entries (if fixed number of entries)
European Inventory of Existing Commercial Chemical Substances (EINECS)	Substances, excluding polymers, that were recorded as being commercially available in the EU from 1 January 1971 to 18 September 1981. These were considered registered under Article 8(1) of the Dangerous Substances Directive (67/548/EEC). They are considered phase-in substances under the REACH Regulation.	2xx-xxx-x 3xx-xxx-x	100,102
European List of Notified Chemical Substances (ELINCS)	Substances notified under the Dangerous Substances Directive Notification of New Substances (NONS) that became commercially available after 18 September 1981.	4xx-xxx-x	4,381
No Longer Polymers (NLP)	The definition of polymers was changed in April, 1992 with the result that substances previously considered to be polymers were no longer regarded as polymers. Consequently, a list, called the NLP-list (No Longer Polymer), was made of such substances that were not covered by the polymer definition but were placed on the market between after 18 September 1981 and 31 October 1993.	5xx-xxx-x	703

== List numbers ==
The European Chemicals Agency (ECHA) applies a format similar to the EC number to what it calls "List number". The number is assigned under the REACH and CLP regulations without being legally recognised. They are not considered official identifiers because they have not been published in the Official Journal of the European Union. List numbers are administrative tools and shall not be used for any official purposes.

List numbers have alphanumerical format and same length as EC numbers (xxx-xxx-x). A list number assigned by ECHA starts with 1, 6, 7, 8, 9, or a letter.

Earlier, list numbers shared the same format with EC numbers. However, as numbers in that format ran out at the end of 2025, the list number format became alphanumerical. The new format retains the same length but begins with a letter instead of a digit.

Once all letters in alphabetical order have been used as the first character, the second character will become a letter, and so on.

List numbers assigned before the format change in December 2025 will remain unchangedstay and are not affected by the new format.

== See also ==
- Registration, Evaluation, Authorisation and Restriction of Chemicals
- European chemical Substances Information System
- CAS registry number
