= Substitution principle (sustainability) =

The substitution principle in sustainability is the maxim of how processes, services, and products should be replaced with alternatives that result in a lower environmental impact. The principle is particularly relevant to the substitution of hazardous chemicals, where substances may be replaced with alternatives that include fewer known hazards.

An example of a strong, hazard-based interpretation of the substitution principle in application regarding chemicals considers the overall impact: "hazardous chemicals should be substituted by less hazardous alternatives or preferably alternatives that mitigates identifiable hazards impacts". The substitution principle is used in areas such as green chemistry, environmental policy, and chemical regulation. Its use incorporates looking at factors such as hazards of alternatives, environmental effects, technical performance, and economic feasibility. Because an alternative may reduce one environmental concern while creating another, substitution requires comparing potential substitutions before selecting the best choice.

== Overview ==
The principle has historically been promoted by environmental groups. This concept is becoming increasingly mainstream, being a key concept in green chemistry and a central element of EU REACH regulation. Critics of the principle claim it is very difficult to implement in reality, especially in terms of legislation.

Nonetheless, the concept is an important one and a key driver behind identifying "Substances of Very High Concern" in REACH and the development of hazardous substance lists such as the SIN List and the 'ETUC Trade Union Priority List'. EU-funded projects such as SubsPort are under development to aid the identification and development of safer substitutes for hazardous chemicals. Environmental organizations have over time promoted safer alternatives and new approaches for replacing substances that are in correlation with health and environmental concerns. The concept later became related to green chemistry and chemical regulation.

The principle is commonly applied in environmental policy to encourage the replacement of scarce or environmentally damaging materials with more sustainable alternatives, such as substituting rare metals with recycled or bio-based materials.

== History and Development ==
The substitution principle developed when growing concerns about the effects of industrial chemicals, pollution, and resource consumption on human health rose. In the twentieth century, people started to become more aware of environmental damage leading efforts to look for safer alternatives . Environmental organizations and researchers brought up the replacement of harmful chemicals with materials that could reduce environmental and health risks.

The principle became even more important in environmental regulation and sustainable development. One development was the European Union's Registration, Evaluation, Authorization and Restriction of Chemicals (REACH) regulation, which entered into force in 2007. REACH came up with requirements for managing chemical risks and promoted the replacement of dangerous substances with alternatives.

Over time, the substitution principle grew beyond chemical safety to have more sustainable practices. These applications include replacing nonrenewable resources with renewable materials, lowering the need for environmentally hazardous products, and improving manufacturing processes. The idea is now associated with efforts to reduce pollution, conserve resources, and encourage more sustainable production and consumption.

The substitution principle continues to play a crucial role in environmental decision making because replacing one material with another does not always mean a reduction in environmental destruction. Looking at the environmental, economic, and social effects of substitutions remains an big part of determining whether substitution supports long term sustainability.

== Environmental and Social Impacts ==
Substituting ecologically damaging materials with safer alternatives can reduce pollution, lower greenhouse gas emissions, and minimize overall carbon footprints. Additionally, sustainable swaps are needed to decrease environmental pressure from resource extraction. Substitution supports broader sustainability goals by encouraging the use of renewable and lower-impact materials. However, some alternatives may generate alternative waste or unrealized health hazards. Some substitutes require greater energy use, water consumption, or land use which shifts environmental stress rather than relieving it.

Economic considerations also influence the effectiveness of substitution. Sustainable alternatives are often less accessible due to higher upfront costs. The cost to transition to substitutes also has an effect on prices for manufacturers and consumers.

The social impact of sustainability efforts, like substitution, are driven by a culture's practices, consumer habits, access to information, and role in the environmental sphere.

== Evaluating Substitution ==
Substitution is observed by comparing the environmental and health effects of a material, chemical, or product with those of its possible alternatives. Alternative assessment is one way to identify and differentiate possible alternatives for harmful chemicals. Variables such as human health concerns, environmental effects, performance, and economic feasibility may be considered when looking at substitution.

Life- cycle assessment can also be used to look at the environmental effects of chemical alternatives across their supply chains and the life cycles of the products they are used in. This method uses different stages of a products life cycle including raw material extraction, production, transportation, use, and disposal.This broader assessment identifies impacts that can be missed when the assessment does not include them. This helps to assess whether a replacement reduces overall harm for the environment rather than shifting the harm from one stage of a products life-cycle to another. Replacing a chemical does not always eliminate environmental or health concerns. A substitute can have hazardous effects on the environment or its production can impact the environment similarly to the original chemical. The leads to a regrettable substitution, where a replacement creates new or similar concerns.

Product design affects whether substitution leads to longer product use or additional cycles of use. Design approaches include remanufacturing and recycling to allow materials or products to be used beyond their original life-cycle.The environmental effects of these approaches depend on the processes required to recover and reuse the product or its materials. Life-cycle assessment can be used to examine these impacts.

== Policy and Regulation ==
Government policies can influence or encourage substitution by restricting companies from using using chemicals of concern or requiring them to consider other alternatives.Substitution can be indirectly affected by changing the costs of different products or technologies. Economic policies that make an environmentally damaging option more expensive often causes producers and consumers to choose alternatives.However, it does not mean the substitute is always safer. If a substitute is not available or does not easily replace the original product, the economic policy will have less effect on producers and consumers.

Substitution is an assumption in economic models of climate policy. Producers may respond to changes in policy by changing inputs used in production, while consumers can replace the goods and services they purchase. Models that assume more substitution produce different estimates of economic costs of climate policies compared to models that do not have many opportunities for substitution.

== Challenges and Limitations ==
There are several challenges that complicate the implementation of the substitution principle in the sustainability domain. Once concern is greenwashing where products marketed as environmentally friendly do not meaningfully reduce ecological harm in comparison to their alternatives.Greenwashing also occurs when companies use vauge environmental claims or misleading reporting and lables to create an impression of sustainability.

Environmental skepticism from the public also poses a barrier to sustainability efforts. When some individuals question or reject aspects of the common scientific findings on climate change, the ability to collectively respond to the climate crisis is hindered. Misinformation from leadership, large companies, and conflicting data contribute to public skepticism delaying the implementation of widespread climate practices like substitution.

Policy gaps and inconsistent regulations across different jurisdictions and regions contribute to conflicting expectations for industry compliance. The inconsistency complicates global supply chains and can discourage companies from investing in safer substitutes when regulatory requirements differ across markets.

== See also ==
- Dashboard of Sustainability
- Circular economy
- Sustainable consumption
- Life-cycle assessment
- Pollution prevention in the United States
- Climate change mitigation
- Fast fashion
