= Substance of very high concern =

Chemical substance that is hazardous to humans or the environment

A substance of very high concern (SVHC) is a chemical substance (or part of a group of chemical substances) which has been proposed as a candidate for inclusion on the Authorization or Restriction list (see: ECHA Lists) of REACH. The addition of a substance to the SVHC Candidate List by the European Chemicals Agency (ECHA) is the first step in the procedure for the authorisation or restriction of a chemical. It is expected that industries operating in EU member states abide by the regulations of REACH and submit chemicals for consideration when appropriate.

The first list of SVHCs was published on 28 October 2008 with the list being updated biannually since then. The most recent update occurred in February 2026, bringing the size to 253 SVHCs.

== Criteria ==
The criteria are given in article 57 of the REACH Regulation. A substance may be proposed as an SVHC if it meets one or more of the following criteria:

- it is carcinogenic;
- it is mutagenic;
- it is toxic for reproduction;
- it is persistent, bioaccumulative and toxic (PBT substances);
- it is very persistent and very bioaccumulative (vPvB substances);
- there is "scientific evidence of probable serious effects to human health or the environment which give rise to an equivalent level of concern"; such substances are identified on a case-by-case basis.

The "equivalent concern" criterion is significant because it is this classification which allows substances which are, for example, neurotoxic, endocrine-disrupting or otherwise present an unanticipated environmental health risk to be regulated under REACH.

Simply because a substance meets one or more of the criteria does not necessarily mean that it will be proposed as an SVHC. Many such substances are already subject to restrictions on their use within the European Union, such as those in Annex XVII of the REACH Regulation. SVHCs are substances for which the current restrictions on use (where these exist) might be insufficient. There are three priority groups for assessment:

- PBT substances and vPvB substances;
- substances which are widely dispersed during use;
- substances which are used in large quantities.

== Procedure for listing ==
Proposals for inclusion of a substance on the list of SVHCs can come either from the European Commission or one of the Member States of the European Union. The proposals are made public by the European Chemicals Agency (ECHA) and are open for public comment for 60–90 days. If the substance is deemed to meet one or more of the criteria, it is then listed as an SVHC.

Once a substance has been listed as an SVHC, the Agency commissions a technical report from one or more national or private laboratories, which analyses the available information on manufacture, imports, uses and releases of the substance, as well as possible alternatives. On the basis of this technical report, the Agency decides whether to prioritise the substance, in effect, whether to make a recommendation to the European Commission to add the substance to Annex XIV of the REACH Regulation, making its use subject to authorisation. The draft recommendations must be made public and opened for comment for three months before the final recommendations are sent to the commission. The first draft recommendations were published on 14 January 2009, and new draft recommendations must be issued at least once every two years.

== Consequences of listing ==
The list of SVHCs is primarily a public list of substances for which the European Chemicals Agency is considering imposing a requirement for authorisation for some or all uses. However, there are some direct consequences of including a substance on the list of SVHCs. Suppliers of pure SVHCs must provide their customers with a safety data sheet (SDS). Suppliers of mixtures of substances which contain more than 0.1% by weight of any SVHC must provide their customers with a safety data sheet on request. Manufacturers or importers of articles containing more than 0.1% by weight of any SVHC must provide their customers, and consumers on request, with adequate information on the safe use and disposal of the article, including the name of the SVHC(s) concerned. From 1 June 2011, manufacturers and importers of articles also have to notify the European Chemicals Agency of the quantities of SVHCs used in their articles.

In addition to the obviously involved chemical industry, there are many more industries affected by this regulation: drapery and leather industry, plastic processing, cosmetic industry, food industry, petroleum processing, printing industry, sports equipment industry, toys industry, recycling industry, electrical engineering industry, fine mechanics industry, optics industry, engine and plant production industry.

== Candidate list of substances of very high concern ==
This list is referred to as the "candidate" list because all substances placed on it are candidates for inclusion in Annex XIV of REACH. If a substance is added to Annex XIV, it is given a "latest application date" and a "sunset date". The sunset date is the date after which the substance cannot be used or imported into the EU without authorisation from the ECHA, and the latest application date is the date by which any applications for use must be submitted to the ECHA.

This table includes the Candidate list updates as of January 2024; find the complete list in references.

Substance name/identifier	EC number	CAS number	Date of inclusion	Reason for inclusion	Status
2,4,6-tri-tert-butylphenol (2,4,6-TTBP)	211-989-5	732-26-3	23 January 2024	Toxic for reproduction Persistent, bioaccumulative and toxic	New addition
2-(2H-benzotriazol-2-yl)-4-(1,1,3,3-tetramethylbutyl)phenol (Octrizole)	221-573-5	3147-75-9	23 January 2024	Very persistent and very bioaccumulative	New addition
2-(dimethylamino)-2-((4-methylphenyl)methyl)-1-(4-(morpholin-4-yl)phenyl)butan-1-one	438-340-0	119344-86-4	23 January 2024	Toxic for reproduction	New addition
Bumetrizole	223-445-4	3896-11-5	23 January 2024	Very persistent and very bioaccumulative	New Addition
Dibutyl phthalate (DBP)	201-557-4	84-74-2	23 January 2024	Endocrine disrupting properties	Updated Entry
Oligomerisation and alkylation reaction products of 2-phenylpropene and phenol	700-960-7	-	23 January 2024	Very persistent and very bioaccumulative	New Addition

Notes

- The CAS numbers for groups of compounds such as "SCCP" are indicative. Such groups can include several compounds, each of which has a different CAS number.
- PBT = persistent, bioaccumulative and toxic
- vPvB = very persistent and very bioaccumulative
