= Chemical safety assessment =

A Chemical safety assessment (CSA) is an analysis used in many situations where chemical are used and where there is a possibility that they may present a risk to life, health or the environment.

The European Union has adopted this phrase to describe a process that has to be performed by registrants for substances manufactured and imported in quantities starting at 10 tonnes per year and by downstream users if their uses are not addressed by their supplier," according to REACH (Registration, Evaluation, Authorisation and Restriction of Chemicals) legislation.

The CSA includes the evaluation of all available relevant information in order to assess risks arising from the manufacture and/or use of a substance. The process needs to be documented adequately and the results have to be documented in a chemical safety report (CSR), which is to be submitted to the European Chemicals Agency as part of the respective registration dossier. The purpose is to ensure that the risks related to the substance are controlled.

The chemical safety assessment of a substance comprises the following steps:

- Assessment of the human health hazard
- Human health hazard assessment of physicochemical properties
- Assessment of the environmental hazard
- Persistent, bioaccumulative and toxic (PBT) and very persistent and very bioaccumulative (vPvB) assessment

The European Chemicals Agency (ECHA) has developed a software tool to support industry in preparing a Chemical Safety Assessment (CSA) and Chemical Safety Report (CSR).

== Chemical Safety Report ==
Chemical Safety Reports are the main end point for data assessment under REACH (the European Community Regulation on chemicals and their safe use, concerning the Registration, Evaluation, Authorisation and Restriction of Chemical substances) in which hazard and exposure data are considered together to assess the risk of a substance.

== See also ==
- Chemical safety
- Safety data sheet
- Occupational exposure banding
- Control banding
