= Registration, Evaluation, Authorisation and Restriction of Chemicals =

European Union regulation

Regulation (EC) No 1907/2006
- European Union regulation
- Title: Regulation concerning the Registration, Evaluation, Authorisation and Restriction of Chemicals (REACH), establishing a European Chemicals Agency (ECHA)
- Made by: European Parliament and Council
- Made under: Art. 95 (EC)
- Journal reference: L396, 30.12.2006, pp. 1–849

History
- Date made: 18 December 2006
- Entry into force: 1 June 2007

Preparative texts
- Commission proposal: COM 2003/0644 Final
- EESC opinion: C112, 30.4.2004, p. 92; C294, 25.11.2005, pp. 38–44.
- CR opinion: C164, 2005, p. 78
- EP opinion: 17 November 2005; 13 December 2006

Other legislation
- Replaces: Reg. (EEC) No 793/93; Reg. (EEC) No 1488/94; Dir. 76/769/EEC; Dir. 91/155/EEC; Dir. 93/67/EEC; Dir. 93/105/EEC; Dir. 2000/21/EC
- Amends: Dir. 1999/45/EC
- Amended by: Reg. (EC) No 1272/2008

Registration, Evaluation, Authorisation and Restriction of Chemicals (REACH) is a European Union regulation dating from 18 December 2006, amended on 16 December 2008 by Regulation (EC) No 1272/2008. REACH addresses the production and use of chemical substances, and their potential impacts on both human health and the environment. Its 849 pages took seven years to pass, and it has been described as the most complex legislation in the Union's history and the most important in 20 years. It is the strictest law to date regulating chemical substances and will affect industries throughout the world. REACH entered into force on 1 June 2007, with a phased implementation over the next decade. The regulation also established the European Chemicals Agency, which manages the technical, scientific and administrative aspects of REACH.

== Overview ==
When REACH is fully in force, it will require all companies manufacturing or importing chemical substances into the European Union in quantities of one tonne or more per year to register these substances with a new European Chemicals Agency (ECHA) in Telakkakatu, (Helsinki), Finland. Since REACH applies to some substances that are contained in objects (articles in REACH terminology), any company importing goods into Europe could be affected.

The European Chemicals Agency has set three major deadlines for registration of chemicals. In general, these were determined by tonnage manufactured or imported, with 1000 tonnes/a. being required to be registered by 1 December 2010 back then, 100 tonnes/a. by 1 June 2013 and 1 tonne/a. by 1 June 2018. In addition, chemicals of higher concern or toxicity also had to meet the 2010 deadline.

About 143,000 chemical substances marketed in the European Union were pre-registered by the 1 December 2008 deadline. Although pre-registering was not mandatory, it allows potential registrants much more time before they have to fully register. Supply of substances to the European market which have not been pre-registered or registered is illegal (known in REACH as "no data, no market").

REACH also addresses the continued use of chemical substances of very high concern (SVHC) because of their potential negative impacts on human health or the environment. From 1 June 2011, the European Chemicals Agency had to be notified of the presence of SVHCs in articles if the total quantity used is more than one tonne per year and the SVHC is present at more than 0.1% of the mass of the object. Some uses of SVHCs may be subject to prior authorisation from the European Chemicals Agency, and applicants for authorisation will have to include plans to replace the use of the SVHC with a safer alternative (or, if no safer alternative exists, the applicant must work to find one) – known as substitution. As of 4 February 2026, there were 253 SVHCs on the candidate list for authorisation.

REACH applies to all chemicals imported or produced in the EU. The European Chemicals Agency will manage the technical, scientific and administrative aspects of the REACH system.

To help simplify the registration of the 143,000 substances and to limit vertebrate animal testing as far as possible, substance information exchange forums (SIEFs) are formed amongst legal entities (such as manufacturers, importers, and data holders) who are dealing with the same substance. This allows them to join forces and finances to create 1 registration dossier. However, this creates a series of new problems as a SIEF is the cooperation between sometimes a thousand legal entities that did not know each other at all before but suddenly must:

- find each other and start communicating openly and honestly
- start sharing data
- start sharing costs in a fair and transparent way
- democratically and in full consensus take the most complex decisions

in order to complete a several thousand end points dossier in a limited time.

The European Commission supports businesses affected by REACH by handing out – free of charge – a software application (IUCLID) that simplifies capturing, managing, and submitting data on chemical properties and effects. Such submission is a mandatory part of the registration process. Under certain circumstances the performance of a chemical safety assessment (CSA) is mandatory and a chemical safety report (CSR) assuring the safe use of the substance has to be submitted with the dossier. Dossier submission is done using the web-based software REACH-IT.

The aim of REACH is to improve the protection of human health and the environment by identification of the intrinsic properties of chemical substances. At the same time, innovative capability and competitiveness of the EU chemicals industry should be enhanced.

== Background ==
The European Commission's (EC) White Paper of 2001 on a 'future chemical strategy' proposed a system that requires chemicals manufactured in quantities of greater than 1 tonne to be 'registered', those manufactured in quantities greater than 100 tonnes to be 'evaluated', and certain substances of high concern (for example carcinogenic, mutagenic and toxic to reproduction – CMRs) to be 'authorised'.

The EC adopted its proposal for a new scheme to manage the manufacture, importation and supply of chemicals in Europe on in October 2003. This proposal eventually became law once the European Parliament officially approved its final text of REACH. It came into force on 1 June 2007.

== Requirements ==
One of the major elements of the REACH regulation is the requirement to communicate information on chemicals up and down the supply chain. This ensures that manufacturers, importers, and also their customers are aware of information relating to health and safety of the products supplied. For many retailers the obligation to provide information about substances in their products within 45 days of receipt of a request from a consumer is particularly challenging. Having detailed information on the substances present in their products will allow retailers to work with the manufacturing base to substitute or remove potentially harmful substances from products. The list of harmful substances is continuously growing and requires organisations to constantly monitor any announcements and additions to the REACH scope. This can be done on the European Chemicals Agency's website.

=== Registration ===
A requirement is to collect, collate and submit data to the European Chemicals Agency (ECHA) on the hazardous properties of all substances (except Polymers and non-isolated intermediates) manufactured or imported into the EU in quantities above 1 tonne per year. Certain substances of high concern, such as carcinogenic, mutagenic and reproductive toxic substances (CMRs) will have to be authorised.

Chemicals will be registered in three phases according to the tonnage of the substance evaluation:

- More than 1000 tonnes a year, or substances of highest concern, must be registered in the first 3 years;
- 100–1000 tonnes a year must be registered in the first 6 years;
- 1–100 tonnes a year must be registered in the first 11 years.

In addition, industry should prepare risk assessments and provide controls measures for using the substance safely to downstream users.

=== Evaluation ===
Evaluation provides a means for the authorities to require registrants, and in very limited cases downstream users, to provide further information.

There are two types of evaluation: dossier evaluation and substance evaluation:

- Dossier evaluation is conducted by authorities to examine proposals for testing to ensure that unnecessary animal tests and costs are avoided, and to check the compliance of registration dossier with the registration requirements. Chemical companies failed to provide "important safety information" in nearly three quarters (74% or 211 of 286) of cases checked by authorities, according to the European Chemicals Agency's 2018 annual progress report. "The numbers show a similar picture to previous years," it said. Industry group Cefic acknowledged the problem.
- Substance evaluation is performed by the relevant authorities when there is a reason to suspect that a substance presents a risk to human health or the environment (e.g. because of its structural similarity to another substance). Therefore, all registration dossiers submitted for a substance are examined together and any other available information is taken into account.

Substance evaluation is carried out under a programme known as the Community Rolling Action Plan (CoRAP). An independent review of progress by national officials published in late 2018 found that 352 substances had so far been prioritised for substance evaluation with 94 completed. For almost half the 94, officials concluded that existing commercial use of the substance is unsafe for human health and/or the environment. Risk management has been initiated for twelve substances since REACH came into force. For 74% of substances (34 out of 46), concerns were demonstrated, but no actual regulatory follow-up has yet been initiated. In addition, national officials concluded that 64% of the substances under evaluation (126 out of 196) lacked the information needed to demonstrate the safety of the chemicals marketed in Europe due to inadequate industry data.

=== Authorisation ===
REACH allows restricted substances of very high concern to continue being used, subject to authorisation. This authorisation requirement attempts to ensure that risks from the use of such substances are either adequately controlled or justified by socio-economic grounds, having taken into account the available information on alternative substances or processes.

The Regulation enables restrictions of use to be introduced across the European Community where this is shown to be necessary. Member States or the Commission may prepare such proposals.

By March 2019, authorisation had been granted 185 times, with no eligible request ever having been rejected. NGOs have complained that authorisations have been granted despite safer alternatives existing and that this was hindering substitution. In March 2019, the European Court of Justice revoked an authorisation in a ruling that criticised the European Chemicals Agency for failing to identify a safer alternative.

=== Information exchange ===
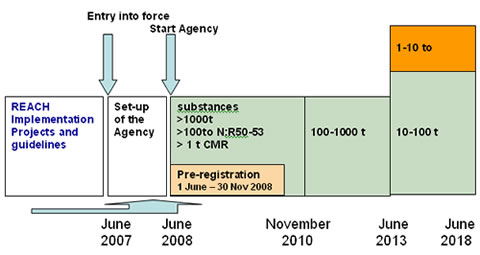
REACh Key Dates

Manufactures and importers should develop risk reduction measures for all known uses of the chemical including downstream uses. Downstream users such as plastic pipe producers should provide detail of their uses to their suppliers. In cases where downstream users decide not to disclose this information, they need to have their own CSR.9

== History ==
REACH is the product of a wide-ranging overhaul of EU chemical policy. It passed the first reading in the European Parliament on 17 November 2005, and the Council of Ministers reached a political agreement for a common position on 13 December 2005. The European Parliament approved REACH on 13 December 2006 and the Council of Ministers formally adopted it on 18 December 2006. Weighing up expenditure versus profit has always been a significant issue, with the estimated cost of compliance being around €5 billion over 11 years, and the assumed health benefits of saved billions of euro in healthcare costs. However, there have been different studies on the estimated cost which vary considerably in the outcome. It came into force on 20 January 2009, and will be fully implemented by 2015.

A separate regulation – the CLP Regulation (for "Classification, Labelling, Packaging") – implements the United Nations Globally Harmonized System of Classification and Labelling of Chemicals (GHS) and will steadily replace the previous Dangerous Substances Directive and Dangerous Preparations Directive.

The REACH regulation was amended in April 2018 to include specific information requirements for nanomaterials.

In the European Green Deal of 2020, a commitment was made to update the REACH regulation to ban between 7,000 and 12,000 toxic substances in all consumer products, except where truly essential. The goal was among the priorities of the European Commission, but is in danger of being radically revised due to lobbying by the EU chemical industry and the positions taken by the European People's Party.

In January 2023, the national authorities of the Netherlands, Germany, Denmark, Norway and Sweden put forward proposals for an EU-wide restriction covering more than 10,000 Per- and polyfluoroalkyl substances (PFAS) across a wide range of uses, a proposal described by the ECHA as "the most extensive [chemical restriction] in the history of the EU".

== Rationale ==
The legislation was proposed under dual reasoning: protection of human health and protection of the environment.

Using potentially toxic substances (such as phthalates or brominated flame retardants) is deemed undesirable and REACH will force the use of certain substances to be phased out. Using potentially toxic substances in products other than those ingested by humans (such as electronic devices) may seem to be safe, but there are several ways in which chemicals can enter the human body and the environment. Substances can leave particles during consumer use, for example into the air where they can be inhaled or ingested. Even where they might not do direct harm to humans, they can contaminate the air or water, and can enter the food chain through plants, fish or other animals. According to the European Commission, little safety information exists for 99 percent of the tens of thousands of chemicals placed on the market before 1981. There were 100,106 chemicals in use in the EU in 1981, when the last survey was performed. Of these only 3,000 have been tested and over 800 are known to be carcinogenic, mutagenic or toxic to reproduction. These are listed in the Annex 1 of the Dangerous Substances Directive (now Annex VI of the CLP Regulation).

Continued use of many toxic chemicals is sometimes justified because "at very low levels they are not a concern to health". However, many of these substances may bioaccumulate in the human body, thus reaching dangerous concentrations. They may also chemically react with one another, producing new substances with new risks.

== In non-EU countries ==
A number of countries outside of the European Union have started to implement REACH regulations or are in the process of adopting such a regulatory framework to approach a more globalized system of chemicals registration under the Globally Harmonized System of Classification and Labelling of Chemicals (GHS). Balkan countries such as Croatia and Serbia are in the process of adopting the EU REACH system under the auspices of the EU IPA programme. Switzerland has moved towards implementation of REACH through partial revision of the Swiss Chemical Ordinance on 1 February 2009. The new Chemicals Management Regulation in Turkey is paving the way for the planned adoption of REACH in 2013. China has moved towards a more efficient and coherent system for the control of chemicals in compliance with GHS.

In the UK, the government announced a "UK REACH" that the UK's Chemical Industry Association described as a "hugely expensive duplication" of the EU's safety data. The new regulations were to be enforced from October 2021 but deferred to October 2023, and then to October 2025. Following industry representations, the responsible Minister announced "that officials would now explore 'a new model' for UK REACH registrations that would look to 'reduce the need for replicating EU Reach data packages'". In March 2021, a group of more than 20 leading UK organisations, including the CHEM Trust and Breast Cancer UK, "rejected industry proposals to streamline UK Reach as a 'major weakening' of the envisaged post-Brexit regime".

== Controversy ==
Over a decade after REACH came into force, progress has been slow. Of the 100,000 chemicals used in Europe today, "only a small fraction has been thoroughly evaluated by authorities regarding their health and environmental properties and impacts, and even fewer are actually regulated," according to a report for the European Commission.

Apart from the potential costs to industry and the complexity of the new law, REACH has also attracted concern because of animal testing. Animal tests on vertebrates are now required but allowed only once per each new substance and if suitable alternatives cannot be used. If a company pays for such tests, it must sell the rights of the results for a "reasonable" price, which is not defined. There are additional concerns that access to the necessary information may prove very costly for potential registrants needing to purchase it.

On 8 June 2006, the REACH proposal was criticized by non-EU countries, including the United States, India and Brazil, which stated that the bill would hamper global trade.

The cosmetics company Lush were critical of the legislation when it was first proposed in 2006, as they believed it would increase animal testing. The cosmetics company wrote to its European customers and also ran an in-store marketing campaign, asking for postcards objecting to the legislation be sent to MEPs, a move which resulted in 80,000 Lush customers sending postcards. In December 2006, Lush protested outside the European Parliament in Strasbourg, by dumping horse manure outside the building.

An opinion in Nature in 2009 by Thomas Hartung and Constanza Rovida estimated that 54 million vertebrate animals would be used under REACH and that the costs would amount to €9.5 billion, set against the annual European industry annual turnover of €507 billion. Hartung is the former head of European Centre for the Validation of Alternative Methods (ECVAM). In a news release, ECHA criticised assumptions made by Hartung and Rovida; ECHA's alternative assumptions reduced sixfold the number of animals.

In the context of preparations for the planned 2025 revision of REACH, researchers and policy platforms have highlighted tensions between environmental protection and industrial competitiveness in European chemicals policy. A 2025 analysis of German stakeholder narratives identified competing frames that prioritise either the reduction of chemical pollution or the competitiveness of the European chemical industry, suggesting that these positions may limit the scope of reform.

== Only representative services ==
Only representatives are EU-based entities that must comply with REACH (Article 8) and should operate standard, transparent working practices. The Only Representative assumes responsibility and liability for fulfilling obligations of importers in accordance with REACH for substances being brought into the EU by a non-EU manufacturer.

Non-EU consultancies offer "only representative" services, though according to REACH it is not possible to register a substance if your "only representative" consultancy company is not based in the EU, unless it is subcontracted to an EU-based registrant.

The SIEFs will bring new challenges. An article in the business news service Chemical Watch described how some "pre-registrants" may simply be consultants hoping for work ("gold diggers") while others may be aiming to charge exorbitant rates for the data they have to offer ("jackals").

== Example of chemical inventories in various countries/regions ==
- Regulation (EC) Nr. 1907/2006 (REACH)
- AICS – Australian Inventory of Chemical Substances
- DSL – Canadian Domestic Substances List
- NDSL – Canadian Non-Domestic Substances List
- KECL (Korean ECL) – Korean Existing Chemicals List
- ENCS (MITI) – Japanese Existing and New Chemical Substances
- PICCS – Philippine Inventory of Chemicals and Chemical Substances
- TSCA – US Toxic Substances Control Act
- Giftliste 1 (Swiss list of toxic substances, repealed in 2005)

== Authorisation List ==
The European Chemical Agency (ECHA) has published the REACH Authorisation List, in an effort to tighten the use of Substances of Very High Concern (SVHCs). The list is an official recommendation from the ECHA to the European Commission. The list is also regularly updated and expanded. Currently the Candidate List for Authorisation comprises a total of 253 SVHCs (see ECHA list at https://echa.europa.eu/candidate-list-table), some of which are already active on the Authorization List.

To sell or use these substances, manufacturers, importers, and retailers in the European Union (EU) must apply for authorization from the ECHA. The applicant is to submit a chemical safety report on the risks entailed by the substance, as well as an analysis of possible alternative substances or technologies including present and future research and development processed.

== See also ==
- Chemicals Strategy for Sustainability Towards a Toxic-Free Environment
- Consumer protection
- Environmental health
- International Material Data System
- Kashinhou – Japanese law
- Pesticides in the European Union
- Porter hypothesis
- Quality of life
- Toxic Substances Control Act of 1976 – US law
