= European Chemicals Agency =

Agency of the European Union

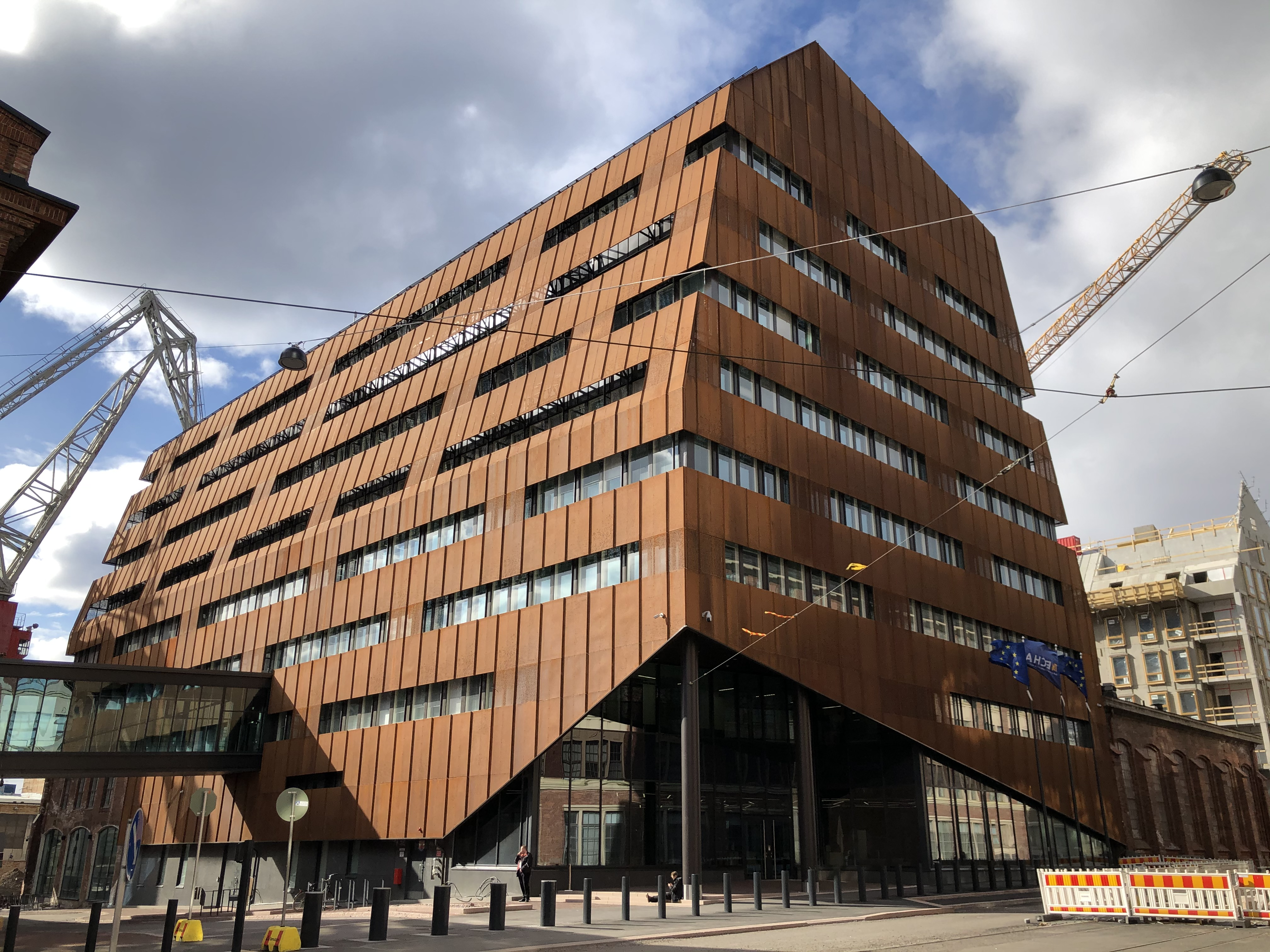
- Headquarters in Helsinki

Agency overview
- Formed: 1 June 2007
- Type: Regulatory Agency of the European Union
- Headquarters: Helsinki, Finland; 60.1581°N 24.9325°E
- Employees: 600
- Agency executive: Sharon McGuinness, Executive Director
- Key document: Regulation (EC) No 1907/2006
- Website: echa.europa.eu

The European Chemicals Agency (ECHA; /ˈɛkə/ EK-ə) is an agency of the European Union working for the safe use of chemicals. It manages the technical and administrative aspects of the implementation of the European Union regulation called Registration, Evaluation, Authorisation and Restriction of Chemicals (REACH). ECHA is the driving force among regulatory authorities in implementing the EU's chemicals legislation. ECHA has to ascertain that companies comply with the legislation, advances the safe use of chemicals, provides information on chemicals and addresses chemicals of concern. It is located in Helsinki, Finland and is operational since 2007. ECHA is an independent and mature regulatory agency established by REACH. It is not a subsidiary entity of the European Commission.

The agency is headed by Executive Director Sharon McGuinness.

== Establishment ==
The ECHA was created by European Union regulation dating from 18 December 2006 to manage the then-new legislation to regulate the manufacture and use of chemical substances. According to a subsequent audit by the European Court of Auditors its objectives are

To ensure a high level of protection of human health and the environment, including the promotion of alternative methods for assessment of hazards relating to substances, as well as the free circulation of substances on the internal market while enhancing competitiveness and innovation.

To ensure that chemicals legislation and the decision making processes and scientific basis underlying it have credibility with all stakeholders and the public.

To coordinate communication concerning the REACH Regulation and in its implementation.

An initial group of 40 staff seconded from Brussels began to set up the Agency in Helsinki on 1 June 2007. The work associated with REACH (Registration, Evaluation, Authorisation and Restriction of Chemicals) was expected to require extensive use of computer systems to store the data on individual chemicals, much of which would be supplied by companies that produced these materials. Hence, from the outset there was a concern that there might be a conflict of interest if ECHA employees had previously worked in industry, or did so after a time with the Agency.

== Tasks ==
=== Registration, evaluation, authorisation and restriction of chemicals ===
The REACH regulation requires companies to provide information on the hazards, risks and safe use of chemical substances that they manufacture or import. Companies register this information with ECHA and it is then freely available on their website. Thousands of the most hazardous and the most commonly used substances have been registered. The information is technical but gives detail on the impact of each chemical on people and the environment. This also gives European consumers the right to ask retailers whether the goods they buy contain dangerous substances.

In 2018, the first "registration" phase of REACH had ended, with over 21,500 chemicals being added to the ECHA database. However, the quality of the information held for those chemicals produced at more than 1000 tonnes per annum was in doubt, with only one third meeting legal requirements. The industry group CEFIC acknowledged the problem. The European Environmental Bureau called for faster enforcement to minimise chemical exposure. Up to 2020, the Agency had identified about 300 substances requiring further review. By 2022, nearly 23,000 substances from 16,000 companies had valid registration dossiers. The information in the dossier depends on the weight of the substance the registrant is dealing with: the least being for 1–10 tonnes/annum and the most for amounts above 1000 tonnes/annum.

=== Classification, labelling and packaging of substances and mixtures ===
The classification and labelling scheme introduces a globally harmonised system for categorising the hazard and handling requirements for chemicals in the EU. This worldwide system makes it easier for workers and consumers to know the side-effects of chemicals and how to use products safely because the labels on products are now the same throughout the world. Companies need to notify ECHA of the classification and labelling of their chemicals. By 2022, the ECHA had received over 5 million notifications for more than 200,000 substances. The information is freely available on their website. Consumers can check chemicals in the products they use.

=== Biocidal products regulation ===
Biocidal products include, for example, insect repellents and disinfectants used in hospitals. The Biocidal Products Regulation (BPR) ensures that there is enough information about these products so that consumers can use them safely. ECHA is responsible for implementing the regulation.

=== Prior informed consent ===
The law on Prior Informed Consent (PIC) sets guidelines for the export and import of hazardous chemicals that are banned or severely restricted in the EU. Through this mechanism, countries due to receive hazardous chemicals are informed in advance and have the possibility of rejecting their import.

=== Controlling hazardous chemicals ===
Substances which may have serious effects on human health and the environment are identified as substance of very high concern (SVHC). These are mainly substances which cause cancer, mutation or are toxic to reproduction as well as substances which persist in the body or the environment and do not break down. Other substances considered as SVHCs include, for example, endocrine disrupting chemicals. Companies are required to inform users about their presence and therefore how to use items containing them safely. Consumers have the right to ask the retailer whether these substances are present in the products they buy.

Once a substance has been officially identified in the EU as being of very high concern, it will be added to a list (the Candidate List). This list is available on ECHA's website, and shows consumers and industry which chemicals are identified as SVHCs. Substances placed on the Candidate List can then move to another list (the Authorisation List). This means that, after a given date, companies will not be allowed to place the substance on the market or to use it, unless they have been given prior authorisation to do so by ECHA. One of the main aims of this listing process is to phase out SVHCs wherever possible. For example, the ECHA claims that trichloroethylene use in the EU has decreased by over 95% in the ten years to 2022 as a result of its authorisation process, although the alternative products that have been substituted for that chemical may themselves not be without risk.

==== SCIP database ====
The EU's waste framework directive aims to decrease waste containing hazardous materials and the ECHA has created a database specifically to assist in dealing with SVHC. Its acronym, SCIP, is derived from Substances of Concern In articles, as such or in complex objects (Products). After 5 January 2021, manufacturers, importers, and distributors of items containing SVHC at an amount greater than 0.1% by weight in their products are obliged to submit information to the database. By May 2022, the database already contained information on over 7.6 million items.

== Substance Infocard ==
The ECHA supplies, via its website, a public summary of all the information it holds on the chemicals registered in its database. It provides this information in the form of a Substance Infocard giving hazards, uses and production or import quantities. Information on over 245,000 chemicals is available, although most do not have full dossiers since they are used in amounts below one tonne per annum. The CAS Registry Number or the European Community number can be used to find substances in the online system. Other possible search terms include the international nonproprietary name (for pharmaceutical drugs), the ISO common name (for agrochemicals) or the IUPAC name.

== See also ==
- European Chemicals Bureau (defunct since 2008)
