= Pesticide regulation in the United States =

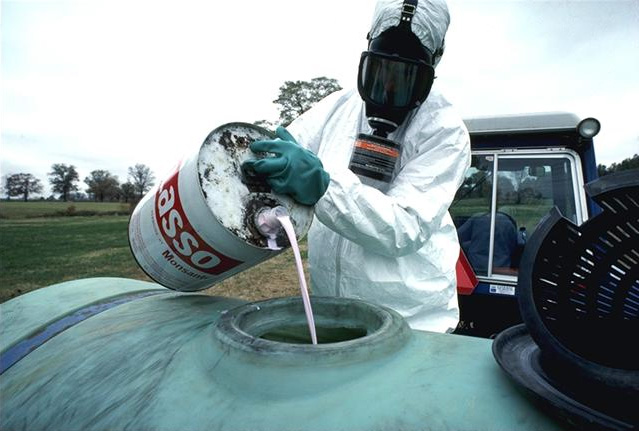
Preparation for an application of a pesticide in the US

Pesticide regulation in the United States is primarily a responsibility of the Environmental Protection Agency (EPA). In America, it was not till the 1950s that pesticides were regulated in terms of their safety. The Pesticides Control Amendment (PCA) of 1954 was the first time Congress passed guidance regarding the establishment of safe limits for pesticide residues on food. It authorized the Food and Drug Administration (FDA) to ban pesticides they determined to be unsafe if they were sprayed directly on food. The Food Additives Amendment, which included the Delaney Clause, prohibited the pesticide residues from any carcinogenic pesticides in processed food. In 1959, pesticides were required to be registered.

In 1970, President Richard Nixon created the EPA and shifted control of pesticide regulation from the US Department of Agriculture (USDA), the US Department of the Interior (DOI), and FDA to the newly created agency. By this time, public awareness of potential human health and environmental health effects had increased. In addition, some members of Congress began to express concerns about the adequacy of pesticide regulation. In 1972, the Federal Environmental Pesticides Control Act (FEPCA) required manufacturers of new pesticides to perform a variety of tests to prove that the pesticide did not have "unreasonable adverse effects" on human health or the environment.

Current law requires the EPA to consider the "ingredients of the pesticide; the particular site or crop on which it is to be used; the amount, frequency, and timing of its use; and storage and disposal practices." The EPA looks at what the potential human health and environmental effects might be associated with the use of the pesticide. The company that wishes to register the pesticide must provide data from various test that are done using EPA guidelines. These tests include: acute toxicity test (short-term toxicity test) and chronic toxicity test (long-term toxicity test). These tests evaluate: whether the pesticide has the potential to cause adverse effects (including cancer and reproductive system disorders) on humans, wildlife, fish, and plants, including endangered species and non-target organisms; and possible contamination of surface water or ground water from leaching, runoff, and spray drift. The registration process can take upwards of 6 to 9 years, and the cost of registration for a single pesticide is in the range of millions of dollars.

== Background ==
In most countries, pesticides must be approved for sale and use by a government agency. In the US, EPA is responsible for regulating pesticides under the Federal Insecticide, Fungicide, and Rodenticide Act (FIFRA) and the Food Quality Protection Act (FQPA). Studies must be conducted to establish the conditions in which the material is safe to use and the effectiveness against the intended pest(s). The EPA regulates pesticides to ensure that these products do not pose adverse effects to humans or the environment. Pesticides produced before November 1984 continue to be reassessed in order to meet the current scientific and regulatory standards. All registered pesticides are reviewed every 15 years to ensure they meet the proper standards. During the registration process, a label is created. The label contains directions for proper use of the material in addition to safety restrictions. Based on acute toxicity, pesticides are assigned to a Toxicity Class.

Some pesticides are considered too hazardous for sale to the general public and are designated restricted use pesticides. Only certified applicators, who have passed an exam, may purchase or supervise the application of restricted use pesticides. Records of sales and use are required to be maintained and may be audited by government agencies charged with the enforcement of pesticide regulations. These records must be made available to employees and state or territorial environmental regulatory agencies.

The EPA regulates pesticides under two main acts, both of which were amended by the Food Quality Protection Act of 1996. In addition to the EPA, USDA and FDA set standards for the level of pesticide residue that is allowed on or in crops The EPA looks at what the potential human health and environmental effects might be associated with the use of the pesticide.

Additionally, EPA uses the National Research Council's four-step process for human health risk assessment: (1) Hazard Identification, (2) Dose-Response Assessment, (3) Exposure Assessment, and (4) Risk Characterization.

== History ==
=== 1910 ===
Congress passed the first law regulating pesticides, the Federal Insecticide Act, in 1910. Its focus was protecting farmers from fraudulent claims.

=== 1940s ===
FIFRA was enacted in 1947 and was a collaboration between the federal government and the chemical industry. It resulted from the increase in pesticide production during and after World War II. At that time, the concern about pesticides was related to pesticide efficacy and producer honesty. FIFRA was passed as a "truth in labeling" law. The goal of the legislation was to maintain pesticide standards while allowing new pesticides to enter the market quickly. The 1947 legislation was an example of an "iron triangle," made up of the House Committee on Agriculture, the USDA, and the pesticide industry. The legislation required that pesticide formulas be registered with USDA, and that the pesticide labels were accurate. The legislation was not intended to enact an active regulatory system; it was to enable the creation of a stable marketplace. The political climate in the US prevented major changes to the regulation due to the public's relative lack of concern, USDA's administration of the law, and agricultural interests in congress.

=== 1950s ===
Committee hearings in 1950-51, led by Congressman James Delaney of New York, were the first instance of government hearings concerning pesticide safety. The hearings resulted in two amendments to the Federal Food, Drug and Cosmetic Act: The Pesticides Control Amendment (PCA) and the Food Additives Amendment (FAA). These two amendments resulted in FDA involvement in pesticide regulation. The PCA of 1954 was the first time Congress passed guidance regarding the establishment of safety limits for pesticide residues on food. PCA authorized the FDA to ban pesticides they determined to be unsafe if they were sprayed directly on food. The Food Additives Amendment, which included the "Delaney Clause," prohibited the pesticide residues from any carcinogenic pesticides in processed food. In 1959, FIFRA was amended requiring that pesticides be registered.

=== 1960s ===
In 1962, The New Yorker published a series of essays by Rachel Carson, later published in book form as Silent Spring, that publicized the negative effects of pesticide use on wildlife. This, along with new evidence that pesticides could have negative impacts on human health, helped spur the creation of the modern environmental movement. Several government agencies, such as the Public Health Service, the Fish and Wildlife Service, and the President's Science Advisory Committee, found evidence that pesticides were negatively affecting human health. There were attempts throughout the 60's to pass legislation reforming FIFRA. The proposals included: moving FIFRA authority from the USDA to the FDA, providing greater public access to pesticide registration data, and mandating better interagency cooperation. None of these proposals gained enough support to pass in both the House and Senate. However, Congress passed an amendment to FIFRA in 1964 allowing the USDA to suspend or cancel a pesticide's registration in order to "prevent an imminent health hazard".

=== 1970s ===
In 1970, President Richard Nixon created the EPA and shifted control of pesticide regulation from USDA, DOI, and FDA to the newly created EPA. By this time public awareness of potential human health and environmental health effects had increased. In addition, some members of Congress began to express concerns about the adequacy of pesticide regulation. The growing public concern created political pressure for pesticide regulation reform. These changes contributed to an environment that enabled an overhaul of pesticide regulation. FIFRA was amended in 1972 by the Federal Environmental Pesticides Control Act (FEPCA). FEPCA required manufacturers of new pesticides to perform a variety of tests to prove that the pesticide did not have "unreasonable adverse effects" on human health or the environment. Already registered pesticides were to be re-registered using these new requirements. The EPA was given the authority to refuse registration to any pesticide it concluded had risks for humans, wildlife, and/or the environment that outweighed the pesticide's benefits. In addition, pesticide registration data was required to be made available to the public after a pesticide had been registered. Pesticides that had been registered prior to 1972 could only be banned after a special review board was convened and determined the pesticide was hazardous. If this occurred, the indemnity clause of FEPCA required the EPA to compensate pesticide manufacturers, distributors, and users for the value of any unused stock they possessed. FEPCA also required EPA to review the registration data from pesticides registered prior to 1972, but did not appropriate funds for the task.

The re-registration process was beset by difficulties throughout the 1970s. FEPCA required the re-registration process to be complete by 1976; however EPA did not begin re-registration until the fall of 1975. Shortly after beginning the re-registration process, congressional investigations revealed that the EPA was taking shortcuts that undermined the purpose of re-registration. EPA was confirming the presence of registration data rather than determining whether the data was adequate. Shortly after this was revealed, an investigation into Industrial Bio-Test Laboratories (IBT) found that it had been routinely falsifying tests. IBT was the nation's largest independent laboratory that conducted toxicity tests. The EPA and the Canadian Department of Health and Welfare determined that "only about 10% of the over 2000 IBT studies which had been submitted in support of pesticide registrations were valid." After these two setbacks, EPA suspended its re-registration program in August 1976. EPA did not restart re-registrations until 1978.

=== 1980s ===
Following the 1980 election of President Ronald Reagan, industry groups attempted to get amendments to FIFRA passed. The pesticide industry was primarily interested in three things: less public access to industry data, longer exclusive use periods, and the right to sue over use of manufacturer data without the manufacturer's permission. Environmental groups prevented the amendments from passing with help from labor groups that had become concerned about the safety of pesticide workers. Until the late 1980s short term reauthorizations of FIFRA were passed, but no changes to the law were enacted.

In 1986, the Campaign for Pesticide Reform (CPR) and the National Agricultural Chemicals Association (NACA) submitted a bill to Congress proposing amendments to FIFRA. CPR was a coalition of environmental, consumer and labor groups. The various groups were persuaded to work together because they were all unhappy with FIFRA. Pesticide manufacturers were frustrated with the amount of time it took to get new pesticides on the market, and wanted an extension on the amount of time they had exclusive right to a pesticide formulation. Environmental groups were frustrated with the indemnity provision of FIFRA, alleging that it made EPA reluctant to ban any pesticides. After a summer of negotiations they submitted a bill that required EPA to review pesticide registration data in order to find data gaps which pesticide manufacturers would have to correct to keep their product on the market. The bill also reinforced the right of the public to access pesticide registration data. However, the CPR-NACA coalition did not include farm groups. This contributed to the failure of the proposal by alienating legislators from farming states.

In 1988, Congress successfully passed an amendment to FIFRA, and President Reagan signed it into law. It required registration of approximately 600 active ingredients within nine years, and required pesticide manufacturers to pay a registration fee to fund the process. The bill repealed EPA's indemnity requirements for manufacturers. The 1988 amendments retained indemnity payments for pesticide users, but the money came from the US Treasury rather than from EPA. It also extended the period of exclusive use for pesticide manufacturers. In 1988 EPA issued an interpretation of the 1958 Delaney Clause that resolved its contradiction with Pesticides Control Amendment (PCA) of 1954. The PCA required EPA to issue tolerances, or maximum acceptable residue levels, for pesticide residues in food. The Delaney Clause forbade the presence of residue from a carcinogenic pesticide in processed foods, and did not address non-cancer risks. As a result, EPA had different standards for raw and processed foods. EPA's 1988 policy stated that it would use a single standard of negligible risk, regardless of a pesticide's carcinogenicity.

=== 1990s ===
In 1992, the US Ninth Circuit Court of Appeals ruled that EPA's 1988 policy was invalid, stating that only Congress could change the Delaney Clause. This created incentive for Congress to amend the FFDCA. Another motivating factor was the release in 1993 of the National Academy of Sciences' report "Pesticides in the Diets of Infants and Children." The report made several recommendations for changes in pesticide regulations to protect children's health. First, the report recommended that the EPA stop using cost-benefit analysis to determine whether a pesticide would be registered, and make decisions based solely on health considerations. Second, they recommended that the EPA develop studies to determine the vulnerability of children and infants to pesticides. Third, NAS recommended that EPA add a 10x safety factor as an added protection. Fourth, NAS recommended EPA collect data on the dietary habits of children. Last, they recommended that EPA consider aggregate measurements for pesticides that use the same mechanism of toxicity. After these two events, Congress passed the Food Quality Protection Act (FQPA) in 1996. FQPA amended FFDCA, resolving the Delaney Clause conflict. It mandated a single standard for pesticide residue in food, regardless of the type of food. It also addressed concerns about children's susceptibility to pesticides. It required EPA to assess risk using information about children's eating habits, to consider the children's susceptibility when making decisions about pesticides, and to publish a special determination addressing the safety of each pesticide for children.

== Federal Insecticide, Fungicide, and Rodenticide Act ==
The Federal Insecticide, Fungicide, and Rodenticide Act (FIFRA) act requires that all pesticides (whether domestic or foreign) sold or distributed in the United States be registered.

There are four types of registrations under FIFRA for pesticide use:

1. Federal Registration Actions: EPA can register pesticides in the United States under Section 3 of FIFRA.
2. Experimental Use Permits (EUPs): EPA allows manufacturers of pesticides to field test their products under development under Section 5 of FIFRA.
3. Emergency Exemptions: EPA allows State and Federal agencies to use an unregistered pesticide in the event of an emergency pest problem in a specific area under Section 18 of FIFRA.
4. State-Specific Registration: States can register a new pesticide for general use, or a federally registered product for an additional use, if there is both a demonstrated "special local need," and a tolerance or another clearance through FFDCA under Section 24(c) of FIFRA.

== Federal Food, Drug, and Cosmetic Act ==
The Federal Food, Drug, and Cosmetic Act (FFDCA) requires the EPA to set limits, tolerance levels, on the amount of pesticides that are found on and in food. The tolerance level is the "maximum permissible level for pesticide residues allowed in or on commodities for human food and animal feed."

== Food Quality Protection Act of 1996 ==
The EPA must find that a pesticide poses a "reasonable certainty of no harm" before that pesticide can be registered for use on food or feed.

Several factors are addressed before a tolerance level is established:

- the aggregate, non-occupational exposure from the pesticide (this includes exposure through diet, drinking water, and the use of the pesticide in and around the home);
- the cumulative effects from exposure to different pesticides that produce similar effects in the human body;
- whether there is increased susceptibility to infants and children, or other sensitive subpopulations, from exposure to the pesticide; and
- whether the pesticide produces an effect humans similar to an effect produced by a naturally occurring estrogen or produces other endocrine-disruption effects.

The act added special attention to how pesticides might impact infants and children, and also required that all pesticides be reevaluated every 15 years.

=== Registration process ===
Before a pesticide can be distributed, sold, and used in the United States it must first go through a registration process with EPA. When a pesticide enters the registration process, the EPA considers the "ingredients of the pesticide; the particular site or crop on which it is to be used; the amount, frequency, and timing of its use; and storage and disposal practices." The EPA looks at what the potential human health and environmental effects might be associated with the use of the pesticide.The company that wishes to register the pesticide must provide data from various test that are done using EPA guidelines. These tests include: acute toxicity test (short-term toxicity test) and chronic toxicity test (long-term toxicity test). These tests evaluate: whether the pesticide has the potential to cause adverse effects (including cancer and reproductive system disorders) on humans, wildlife, fish, and plants, including endangered species and non-target organisms; and possible contamination of surface water or ground water from leaching, runoff, and spray drift. The registration process can take upwards of 6 to 9 years, and the cost of registration for a single pesticide is in the range of millions of dollars.

EPA requires pesticide registrants to report all problems with a registered pesticide. If any problems should arise from any type of pesticide, the agency takes swift action to recall those products from shelves. These problematic products can be determined as faulty, substandard, or could simply cause injury to the user of the pesticide.

The Pesticide Registration Fund is used to help finance practices and studies for new products of active ingredients (AI) pesticides. To register new pesticides, there are about 140 categories that are split into three major sections: new AI, maintenance/product use, and reassessment of current pesticides. The expected cost and fees to register new pesticides are $630,000 for new AI, $20,000 for maintenance products, and a minimum of $75,000 for reassessment of current products.

=== Labeling of pesticides ===
A pesticide can only be used legally according to the directions on the label that is included at the time of the sale of the pesticide. The language that is used on the label must be approved by the EPA before it can be sold or distributed in the United States. The purpose of the label is to "provide clear directions for effective product performance while minimizing risk to human health and the environment." A label is a legally binding document that mandates how the pesticide can and must be used and failure to follow the label as written when using the pesticide is a federal offense.

=== State regulation ===
States are authorized to pass their own pesticide regulations provided they are at least as stringent as federal regulations. States receive their pesticide regulation authority through FIFRA and through state pesticide laws. States can require registration of pesticides that are exempt under FIFRA. When there is a special local need for a particular pesticide, states are authorized to add uses to that pesticide under section 24(c) of FIFRA.

State regulation of pesticides began in 1975. EPA conducted a pilot program with six states taking over primary enforcement responsibility for FIFRA. In 1978 FIFRA was amended and authorized states to have primary enforcement responsibility, following an EPA determination that they meet three requirements. First, the state must have state pesticide regulations that are at least at stringent as the federal regulations. Second, the state must have adopted procedures to allow enforcement responsibilities to be carried out. Third, the state must keep adequate records detailing enforcement actions. If the EPA determines that the state agency has not carried out its enforcement responsibilities, EPA reports the allegation to the state. At this point the state is given 90 days to respond, after which EPA can rescind the state's enforcement authority if it is deemed necessary. The enforcement responsibilities include ensuring that pesticide users follow label requirements, investigating pesticide use complaints, and inspections of pesticide users, dealers, and producers. The state agencies also have primary responsibility for training and certifying pesticide applicators.

Currently, all states have enforcement responsibility and most have certification authority. The lead agency for pesticide regulation varies from state to state but it is typically the state department of agriculture. FIFRA authorizes EPA to provide funding for state pesticide programs. Many states augment the funds with user fees such as pesticide registration fees.

==== Enforcement ====
The agreement between the EPA and the lead agency lays out a certain number of various types of investigations that must be carried out annually. These include:

- Follow-up investigations: Occurs after a complaint involving pesticide application has been filed. The complaint could involve: drift of pesticides, failure to follow label directions, or human health concerns following pesticide exposure
- Pesticide use inspections: Inspections of commercial or private pesticide applicators to ensure label requirements are being followed
- Marketplace and dealer inspections: Inspections of pesticide sellers to ensure that only registered pesticides are being sold and to make sure adequate records are being kept.
- Producer establishment inspections: Inspections to ensure only registered active ingredients are being produced and that required records are being maintained.

==== Training and certification ====
Most states have several types of commercial applicator certifications, and one type of private applicator certification. FIFRA requires that commercial applicators pass a written exam prior to receiving a license. There is no requirement that private applicators complete a written exam as part of their certification. Many agricultural states do not require private applicators to take written exams because they have many private applicators (farmers) seeking certification.

==== State registration ====
States are allowed to register a new end use product or an additional use of a federally registered product if the situation meets the requirements specified in section 24(c) of FIFRA:

- If there is a special local need
- If the use is a food or feed use, the use must be covered by necessary tolerances or exemptions under the Federal Food, Drug and Cosmetic Act
- Registration for the use has not been previously suspended, cancelled, etc. because of health or environmental concerns
- Registration is in line with FIFRA goals

FIFRA authorizes states to issue experimental use permits (EUP), special local needs registrations (SLN) and apply for emergency exemptions. In general, states can only grant EUPs for the purpose of gathering information to support the state SLN registration process, or for experimental purposes. Section 5 of FIFRA authorizes the lead state agency to grant EUPs in accordance with the EPA-approved state plan.

===== Special local need registrations =====
States are authorized by FIFRA section 24(c) to permit additional uses of federally registered pesticides through special local needs (SLN) registrations. SLN registrations are only valid in the state that issues them and must be reviewed by the EPA after the state grants the registration. The state agency must consult with EPA personnel before issuing SLN for a pesticide use that was voluntarily canceled. FIFRA section 24(c) allows states to issue SLNs under these conditions:

- There is a special local need for that product use.
- The use, if a food or feed use is covered by an appropriate tolerance or has been exempted from the requirement of a tolerance.
- The registration for the same use has not previously been denied, disapproved, suspended, or canceled by EPA, or voluntarily canceled by the registrant subsequent to EPA's issuance of a notice of intent to cancel because of health or environmental concerns about an ingredient contained in the product, unless EPA has reversed the original action.
- The registration is in accord with the purposes of FIFRA.
- If the proposed use or product falls into one of the following categories, the state must first determine that it will not cause unreasonable adverse effects on man or the environment:
  - Its composition is not similar to any federally registered product;
  - Its use pattern is not similar to any federally registered use of the same product or a product of similar composition; and
  - Other uses of the same product, or uses of a product of similar composition, have had their registration denied, disapproved, suspended, or canceled by the Administrator.

A state may register a new end-use product under one of two conditions:

- The product is identical in composition to a federally registered product but has differences in packaging, or in the identity of the formulator; or
- The product contains the same active and inert ingredients as a federally registered product, but in different percentages.

===== Emergency exemptions =====
There are four situations in which EPA can exempt state agencies from FIFRA regulations:

1. Specific exemption
2. Quarantine exemption
3. Public health exemption
4. Crisis exemption

A specific exemption can be authorized when there is a threat of a significant economic loss, or there is significant risk to an endangered species, threatened species, beneficial organism, or the environment. The specific exemption applies for a specific time period, up to one year and can be renewed.

A quarantine exemption can be authorized in order to control the spread of a pest or introduction of a pest not known to be prevalent in the concerned region. This exemption can apply for up to three years and can be renewed. A public health exemption can be authorized to control a pest believed to cause a significant risk to public health. The exemption can be authorized for up to one year, and can be renewed.

A crisis exemption is allowed when the time frame between recognition of a threat and the need to act is too short to allow the state agency to obtain one of the other three exemptions. The state agency is required to inform EPA prior to issuing the emergency exemption. The duration of the exemption can be no more than 15 days, unless there is a pending specific, quarantine or public health exemption application with the EPA.

==== Pesticide disposal ====
Pesticide disposal is handled through state programs. Most states have developed pesticide collection efforts in order to assist citizens in disposing of pesticides in an environmentally friendly way. Studies have shown that consumers store waste pesticides because they do not know the regulations for disposing of them. The Universal Waste Rule was entered into the federal register in 1995, and it provided guidelines for storage, transport, and disposal of unwanted pesticides. Many states have adopted UWR as their regulations for unwanted pesticides.

==== California's regulations ====
California's lead agency is the California Department of Pesticide Regulation (DPR), which is within the California Environmental Protection Agency. California controls applicator licensing and pesticide registration at the state level. Enforcement and compliance of pesticide regulations occurs at the county level by the County Agricultural Commission (CAC).

In 2015, the DPR set regulation of the pesticide chloropicrin higher than the EPA. California farmers are limited to an application of chloropicrin on forty acres per day. The pesticide has caused coughing fits, irritated eyes, and headaches.

===== State agency functions =====
- Statewide licensing programs for pesticide applicators and users.
- Evaluate and register pesticides before they can be used in California
- Perform human health risk assessments
- Perform illness surveillance
- Provide worker safety guidelines
- Test produce for pesticide residue

===== County agricultural commission =====
- Permit Duties
  - Evaluate permit applications to determine if proposed pesticide use will cause harm to any sensitive population or ecosystem, such as a wetland
  - Issue permits for site and time-restricted uses of restricted use pesticides
  - Require pesticide application practices to minimize risks
  - Determine whether a similar pesticide could be as effective with fewer side effects
- Ensure compliance
- Perform inspections
- Investigate pesticide injuries and illnesses
- Perform enforcement actions
  - Protect groundwater and surface water from contamination
  - Prohibit pest control company from operating in the county
  - Prohibit harvest of produce with illegal pesticide residue
  - Issue civil or criminal penalties

Restricted use pesticides are pesticides that have a higher potential for adverse impact on humans or the environment. California is the only state that requires a permit in addition to a license in order to use restricted pesticides. The county agricultural commissioner examines the permit application to determine if there is potential harm to people or the environment. Commissioners are allowed to evaluate permits within the framework of the local conditions. Commissioners are also allowed to classify a pesticide as posing an "undue hazard" in the local environment, which requires individuals to obtain a permit in order to use that pesticide. Individuals directly impacted by the planned pesticide use can appeal the commissioner's permitting decision.

==== New York's regulations ====
The New York State Department of Environmental Conservation is the state agency that regulates pesticides and is responsible for compliance assistance, public outreach activities and enforcement of State pesticide laws.

=== Non-regulatory policy mechanisms ===
The EPA PestWise program is a consortium of four EPA environmental stewardship programs, the Pesticide Environmental Stewardship Program, the Strategic Agriculture Initiative, the Biopesticide Demonstration Program and the Pesticide Registration Renewal Improvement Act Partnership, that work to protect human health and the environment through innovative pest management practices.

Each stewardship program focuses on accomplishing three main goals:

1. Encourage the adoption of Integrated Pest Management practices through grants and other technology transfer initiatives.
2. Provide assistance for transitioning to Integrated Pest Management practices.
3. Increase public understanding of pests and pesticide risk as well as demand for sustainable approaches to pest control.

=== Pesticide Environmental Stewardship Program ===
The Pesticide Environment Stewardship Program (PESP) was established in 1994 with the mission of reducing pesticide risk in both agricultural and non-agricultural settings through public private partnerships that promote IPM practices and the use of biological pesticides. The program is guided by the principle that the informed actions of pesticide users can potentially reduce pesticide risk more efficiently and to a greater extent than can be achieved through regulatory mandates. Additionally, PESP annually awards a maximum of $50,000 in grants to each of the ten EPA regional areas for projects that promote and support IPM practices and pesticide risk reduction activities.

=== Strategic Agriculture Initiative ===
The Strategic Agricultural Initiative (SAI) is a collaborative partnership between EPA and members of the agricultural community. SAI facilitates the transition away from the application of high-risk agricultural pesticides to using IPM methods that are cost-effective and beneficial to human health and the environment. 1.5 million dollars are distributed annually to IPM projects in the form of competitive grants. The grants are awarded through each EPA region, ensuring that the unique needs of each region are addressed appropriately. Additionally, the EPA assigns Regional Specialists that assist the agricultural growers with outreach and communication, collaborating with other stakeholders, and facilitating technology transfers. From 2003 to 2006, SAI helped agricultural growers implement IPM practices on 1,200,000 acres (4,900 km^{2}), leading to a 30% reduction of high-risk pesticides on those lands.

=== Biopesticide Demonstration Project ===
Established in 2003, the Biopesticides Demonstration Project (BDP) is a joint venture between the EPA and USDA. The overarching goal of the program is to reduce exposure to pesticides and risks of pesticide use through the increased adoption of biopesticides within the agriculture community. The BDP was developed to give agricultural growers the opportunity to observe new and innovative biopesticides across a range of agricultural conditions. To increase the awareness and share knowledge about different options for incorporating biopesticides in current farming techniques, the BDP awards competitive grants to field demonstration projects that have implemented biopesticides within an IPM system. BDP also encourages public private partnerships by providing grants to university researchers who form partnerships with agricultural growers and biopesticide companies to demonstrate the effectiveness of biopesticides. During the first five years of the program, more than 50 grants totaling 1.2 million dollars have been awarded to BDP projects. The results of these projects will be housed in a database that will be made accessible to the general public.

=== Pesticide Registration Renewal Improvement Act Partnership ===
In 2008, the Pesticide Registration Improvement Renewal Act Partnership (PRIA2) was created to promote pesticide risk reduction in the environment through the demonstration of IPM practices and technologies. PRIA2 grants a maximum of $250,000 to projects that help growers adopt IPM practices and on projects that educate our students and citizens about the benefits of IPM techniques. Since 2008, $2.3 million have been allocated to 11 grant projects. In addition to funding, PRIA2 provides assistance to the grant recipients by giving them access to data and analysis on costs associated with adopting IPM as well as measures and documents the effects of IPM programs on human health, the community and the environment.

== 2022 pesticide regulation ==
On April 14, 2022, EPA published a policy regarding pesticide effectiveness. Officially starting on June 14, 2022, this policy requires reliable data proving a pesticide's effectiveness against specific invertebrate pests. The pests that are being targeted are those that cause harm to health, those that damage wood structures, and invasive species. Some of the most harmful insects to human health are ticks and mosquitoes because of their ability to carry and spread diseases, such as Dengue Fever, Malaria, and Lyme disease. Invasive species, such as the Asian Longhorn Beetle, cause ecological and economical concern because they destroy important plant species that provide ecosystem services. (Ecosystem services are free services provided by nature that benefits humanity through aesthetics, health, climate regulation, food, etc.) The main goals and purpose of this policy is to create an accurate data record of effective pesticides and lay out direct requirements to pesticide producers, agricultural farmers, universities researching pesticide use, etc.

One of the reasons the EPA intends to collect data on pesticide use is because of the various indirect harms that pesticides have on unintended targets, such as ecologically important insects. Even if an insecticide successfully regulates a pest in an agricultural system, it can accidentally harm natural enemies that are essential to surrounding ecosystems. Some pesticides may also lower pollinator population in the area. Other organisms outside of insects have a possibility of being directly or indirectly harmed. The food chain in aquatic systems can be negatively effected when pesticides enter fish tissue and lead to fatal diseases. The data that comes from the 87 Fed. Reg. 22464 policy may help determine the success of pesticides on intended pests and weigh the possibility of unintended or unexpected effects on outside ecosystems.

== Health and safety ==
Disclosure and product safety are the difference between legal pesticide application and assault with a deadly weapon.

In most areas, physicians are mandated to file a report for "Any person suffering from any wound or other physical injury inflicted upon the person where the injury is the result of assaultive or abusive conduct." Mandated reporters are obligated to submit a report to a local law enforcement agency as follows.

1. The name and location of the injured person, if known.
2. The character and extent of the person's injuries.
3. The identity of any person the injured person alleges inflicted the wound, other injury, or assaultive or abusive conduct upon the injured person.

Employers must inform and train employees prior to pesticide exposure to avoid criminal prosecution that could occur in addition to workers compensation obligations when the employee consults a physician.

In United States common law, non-criminal battery is "harmful or offensive" contact resulting in injury that does not include intent to commit harm. This is called tortuous battery, and this falls into the same category as automobile accidents which is handled with workers compensation. This is applicable even if there is a delay between the harmful act and the resulting injury.

The definition of criminal battery is: (1) unlawful application of force (2) to the person of another (3) resulting in bodily injury. For example, a crime has been committed if the employer fails to disclose pesticide exposure in accordance with public law (unlawful force) then subsequently violates the product labeling in the assigned work area (to the person) resulting in permanent disability (bodily injury).

Pesticide injury is an accident and not a crime if the state or territorial Environment Agency is informed, employees are properly informed and trained prior to exposure, and product label restrictions are not violated. Similar principles apply to rental property occupants, occupants of public buildings like schools, customers exposed by a business owner, and the public.

=== Hazard communication ===
A summary of workers rights is published by the Occupational Safety and Health Administration (OSHA).

The Hazard Communication Standard (HCS) first went into effect in 1985 and has since been expanded to cover almost all workplaces under OSHA jurisdiction. The details of the Hazard Communication standard are rather complicated, but the basic idea behind it is straightforward. It requires chemical manufacturers and employers to communicate information to workers about the hazards of workplace chemicals or products, including training.

The HCS was first adopted in 1983 in the United States with limited scope (48 FR 53280; November 25, 1983). In 1987, scope was expanded to cover all industries where employees are potentially exposed to hazardous chemicals (52 FR 31852; August 24, 1987). This is managed nationally within the US by OSHA. When a state has an approved plan, this is managed by that state instead. The standard is identified in 29 C.F.R. 1910.1200.

The United States Department of Defense manages environmental hazards in accordance with military policy that may deviate from public laws.

Employers must conduct training in a language comprehensible to employees to be in compliance with the standard. Workers must be trained at the time of initial assignment and whenever a new hazard is introduced into their work area. The purpose for this is so that workers can understand the hazards they face and so that they are aware of the protective measures that should be in place.

When OSHA conducts an inspection, the inspector will evaluate the effectiveness of the training by reviewing records of what training was done and by interviewing employees who use chemicals to find out what they understand about the hazards.

The United States Department of Transportation (DOT) regulates transportation of dangerous goods within the territory of the US by Title 49 of the Code of Federal Regulations.

All chemical manufacturers and importers must communicate hazard information through product labels and Material Safety Data Sheets (MSDSs). Employers whose employees may be exposed to hazardous chemicals on the job must provide hazardous chemical information to those employees through the use of MSDSs, properly labeled containers, training, and a written hazard communication program. This standard also requires the employer to maintain a list of all hazardous chemicals used in the workplace. The MSDSs for these chemicals must be kept current and they must be made available and accessible to employees in their work areas.

Chemicals that may pose health risks or those that are physical hazards (such as fire or explosion) are covered. List of chemicals that are considered hazardous are maintained according to the use or purpose. There are several existing sources that manufacturers and employers may consult. These include:

- Any substance for which OSHA has a standard in force, including any substance listed in the Air Contaminants regulation.
- Substances listed as carcinogens (causing cancer) by the National Toxicology Program (NTP) or the International Agency for Research on Cancer (IARC).
- Substances listed in the Threshold Limit Values for Chemical Substances and Physical Agents, published by the American Conference of Governmental Industrial Hygienists (ACGIH).
- Restricted Use Products (RUP) Report; EPA

There are other sources of information about chemicals used in industry as a result of state and federal laws regarding the Community Right to Know Act.

The Air Resources Board is responsible for public hazard disclosures in California. Pesticide use disclosures are made by each pest control supervisor to the County Agricultural Commission. Epidemiology information is available from the California Pesticide Information Portal, which can be used by health care professionals to identify the cause for environmental illness.

Under the Oregon Community Right to Know Act (ORS 453.307-372) and the federal Superfund Amendments and Reauthorization Act (SARA) Title III, the Office of the State Fire Marshal collects information on hazardous substances and makes it available to emergency responders and to the general public. Among the information which companies must report are:

- Inventories of amounts and types of hazardous substances stored in their facilities.
- Annual inventories of toxic chemicals released during normal operations.
- Emergency notification of accidental releases of certain chemicals listed by the Environmental Protection Agency.

The information can be obtained in the form of an annual report of releases for the state or for specific companies. It is available on request from the Fire Marshal's Office and is normally free of charge unless unusually large quantities of data are involved.

=== Worker protection standard ===
EPA registers pesticides and insecticides as either unclassified or restricted use pesticide (RUP). Unclassified pesticide is available over-the-counter. This licensing program exists in cooperation with USDA and state regulatory agencies.

Two items are required by law for all registered pesticides and insecticides.

- Product Label
- Material Safety Data Sheet

The product label describes how to use the product.

The Material Safety Data Sheet provides specific safety and hazard information, and this must be provided to physicians in the event that the product has been mis-used so that appropriate diagnostic testing and treatment can be obtained in a timely manner.

RUP requires license for purchase. The process required to obtain a pest control licenses is regulated by a combination of state laws, federal laws, common law, and private company policies.

All RUP applications must be recorded to identify the date, location, and type of pesticide applied. Federal law requires a minimum record retention period, which require 24 months of records to be maintained except when extended to a longer period by state laws.

There are two categories of RUP user in most areas: supervisor and applicator. A pest control supervisor license is required to purchase RUP and keep records. The pest control supervisor must ensure pest control applicators are competent to use any restricted use products. These requirements vary according to state and local law, where California has the most restrictive laws.

Further information can be obtained from the following organizations.

- AAPCO—Assoc. of American Pesticide Control Officials
- AAPSE—American Assoc. of Pesticide Safety Educators
- CTAG—Certification and Training Assessment Group
- CPARD—Certification Plan & Reporting Database
- POINTS—Pesticide of Interest Reporting Database
- NASDA Pesticide Safety Programs
- Division of Toxicology and Environmental Medicine; Agency for Toxic Substances and Disease Registry
- National Toxicology Program

40 CFR Part 170 requires the following in the United States.

- Pesticide safety training
- Notification of pesticide applications
- Use of personal protective equipment
- Restricted entry intervals following pesticide application
- Decontamination supplies
- Emergency medical assistance

=== Community right to know ===
Environmental health and safety outside the workplace is established by the Emergency Planning and Community Right-to-Know Act (EPCRA), which is managed by the EPA and various state and local government agencies.

State and local agencies maintain epidemiology information required by physicians to evaluate environmental illness.

Air quality information must be provided by pest control supervisors under license requirements established by the Worker Protection Standard when Restricted use pesticide is applied.

The list of restricted use pesticides is maintained by the US EPA.

Additionally, specific environmental pollutants are identified in public law, which extends to all hazardous substances even if the item is not identified as a restricted use pesticide by the EPA. As an example, cyfluthrin, cypermethrin, and cynoff contain cyanide, which is one of the most toxic known substances, but some of the products that contain these chemicals may not be identified as restricted use pesticide.

Some specific chemicals, such as cyaniate, cyanide, cyano, and nitrile compounds, satisfy the specific hazard definition that is identified in public law regardless of whether or not the item is identified on the list of restricted use pesticides maintained by the United States Environmental Protection Agency.

Most developed countries have similar regulatory practices. Pesticides and insecticides interests in the European Union are managed by the European Environment Agency.

Environmental illness share characteristics with common diseases. For example, cyanide exposure symptoms include weakness, headache, nausea, confusion, dizziness, seizures, cardiac arrest, and unconsciousness. Chest pain caused by pesticide induced bronchitis, chest pain due to asthma, and chest pain due to heart disease are all chest pain, so physicians may be unable to link pesticide exposure to environmental illness unless that information is readily available.

California requires all application by licensed pest control personnel to be disclosed, in addition to Restricted Use Pesticide. This information can be used by physicians. This is the most extensive environmental public health program in the US.

Failure of physicians to obtain pesticide disclosure will result in improper, ineffective, or delayed medical diagnosis and treatment for environmental illness caused by exposure to hazardous substance and by exposure to radiation.

=== U.S. Department of Transportation ===
The Pipeline and Hazardous Materials Safety Administration within the Department of Transportation (DOT) is responsible for maintaining the list of hazardous materials within the United States.

All hazardous materials that are not created at the work site must be transported by motor vehicle. The safety and security of the hazardous materials public transportation system is enforced by DOT.

DOT regulates mandatory labeling requirements for all hazardous materials. This is in addition to requirements by other federal agencies, including EPA and OSHA.

DOT is responsible for enforcement actions and public notification regarding hazardous chemical releases and exposures, including incidents involving federal workers.

DOT requires that all buildings and vehicles containing hazardous materials must have signs that disclose specific types of hazards. Hazardous materials shipper must meet the DOT's hazardous materials regulations (HMR), which are required for certified first responder to recognize unsafe conditions during hazardous substance release that can occur during transportation accidents, building fires, and extreme weather conditions (e.g., tornado, hurricane).

== See also ==
- Regulation of pesticides in the European Union
- Special review
- Locations with pesticide ordinances
