= Right to know =

Philosophical concept and legal principle

Right to know is a human right enshrined in law in several countries. UNESCO defines it as the right for people to "participate in an informed way in decisions that affect them, while also holding governments and others accountable". It pursues universal access to information as essential foundation of inclusive knowledge societies. It is often defined in the context of the right for people to know about their potential exposure to environmental conditions or substances that may cause illness or injury, but it can also refer more generally to freedom of information or informed consent.

== Australia ==
A right to know regarding environmental hazard information is protected by Australian law, which is described at Department of Sustainability, Environment, Water, Population and Communities.

Right to know regarding workplace hazard information is protected by Australian law, which is described at Safe Work Australia and at the Hazardous Substances Information System.

== Canada ==
Right to know regarding workplace hazard information is protected by Canadian law.

Right to know regarding environmental hazard information is protected by Canadian law, which is described at Environment Canada.

== Europe ==
Europe consists of many countries, each of which has its own laws. The European Commission provides central access to most of the information about individual regulatory agencies and laws.

Right to know about environmental hazards is managed by the European Commission's Directorate-General for the Environment and by the European Environment Agency.

Right to know about workplace hazards is managed by the European Agency for Safety and Health at Work.

== United States ==
In the context of the United States workplace and community environmental law, right to know is the legal principle that the individual has the right to know the chemicals to which they may be exposed in their daily living. It is embodied in United States federal law as well as in local laws in several U.S. states. "Right to Know" laws take two forms: Community Right to Know and Workplace Right to Know. Each grants certain rights to those groups. The "right to know" concept is included in Rachel Carson's book Silent Spring.

Toxic substances used in the work area must be disclosed to the occupants under laws managed by Occupational Safety and Health Administration.

Hazardous substances used outside buildings must be disclosed to the appropriate state or local agency responsible for state environmental protection, including regulatory actions outside federal land. Use on federal land is managed by the United States Environmental Protection Agency and the Bureau of Land Management.

The US Department of Defense is self-regulating, and as such, is immune to state and federal law pertaining to Occupational Safety and Health Administration OSHA and Environmental Protection Agency (EPA) regulations on foreign and domestic soil.

=== Occupational Safety and Health Administration ===
Occupational Health and Safety is managed within most states under federal authority.

Workplace safety and health in the U.S. operates under the framework established by the federal Occupational Safety and Health Act of 1970 (OSH Act).

Occupational Safety and Health Administration (OSHA) within the U.S. Department of Labor is responsible for issuing and enforcing regulations covering workplace safety.

The Department of Transportation is responsible for transportation safety and for maintaining the list of hazardous materials.

The Environmental Protection Agency is responsible for maintaining lists of specific hazardous materials.

=== Environmental Protection Agency ===
Environmental health and safety outside the workplace is established by the Emergency Planning and Community Right-to-Know Act (EPCRA), which is managed by the Environmental Protection Agency (EPA) and various state and local government agencies.

State and local agencies maintain epidemiology information required by physicians to evaluate environmental illness.

Air quality information must be provided by pest control supervisors under license requirements established by the Worker Protection Standard when restricted use pesticide is applied.

The list of restricted use pesticides is maintained by the US EPA.

Additionally, specific environmental pollutants are identified in public law, which extends to all hazardous substances even if the item is not identified as a restricted use pesticide by the EPA. As an example, cyfluthrin, cypermethrin, and cynoff produce hydrogen cyanide upon combustion, but some pesticides that inadvertently produce noxious chemicals may not be identified as restricted-use pesticides.

- Title 42 U.S.C. Section 7412 identifies the list of environmental pollutants.

Some specific chemicals, such as cyanate, cyanide, cyano, and nitrile compounds, satisfy the specific hazard definition that is identified in public law regardless of whether or not the item is identified on the list of restricted use pesticides maintained by the United States Environmental Protection Agency. Title 42 U.S.C. Section 7413 contains the reporting requirement for environmental pollutants.

Environmental illness share characteristics with common diseases. For example, cyanide exposure symptoms include weakness, headache, nausea, confusion, dizziness, seizures, cardiac arrest, and unconsciousness. Influenza and heart disease include the same symptoms.

Failure to obtain proper disclosure that is required by physicians will result in improper, ineffective, or delayed medical diagnosis and treatment for environmental illness caused by exposure to hazardous substance and by exposure to radiation.

=== Department of Transportation (DOT) ===
The Library Pipeline and Hazardous Material Safety Administration within the US Department of Transportation is responsible for maintaining the list of hazardous materials within the United States.

All hazardous materials that are not created at the work site must be transported by motor vehicle. The safety and security of the public transportation system is enforced by the Department of Transportation.

The Department of Transportation also regulates mandatory labeling requirements for all hazardous materials. This is in addition to requirements by other federal agencies, like the United States Environmental Protection Agency, and Occupational Safety and Health Administration.

DOT is responsible for enforcement actions and public notification regarding hazardous chemical releases and exposures, including incidents involving federal workers.

DOT requires that all buildings and vehicles containing hazardous materials must have signs that disclose specific types of hazards for certified first responder.

=== Department of Energy (DOE) ===
Safety of certain workers is governed by the US Department of Energy, such as mine workers. Public information can be obtained in the form of directives.

=== Department of Defense (DOD) ===
The United States Department of Defense manages environmental safety independent of OSHA and EPA. Spills, mishaps, illnesses, and injuries are not normally handled in accordance with local, state, and federal law.

Failure to administer discipline for illegal activity occurring within a military command is considered to be dereliction of duty, which is administered under the Uniform Code of Military Justice.

Individuals with information about environmental crimes and injuries involving the military are protected by Whistleblower protection in United States. Government employees, government contractors, and military officers often lack the training, education, licensing, and experience required to understand the legal requirements involving environmental safety. The sophistication required to understand legal requirements is not normally required for promotion and contractor selection within the military. Because of this, specific rules are documented in orders and directives that need to be written in plain language intended to be understood by people that have a 4th-grade reading ability.

Laws are enforced by the commanding officer in military organizations. The commanding officer typically has the ability to read and understand written requirements. A Flag Officer is subject to Court-martial action if laws or government policies are violated under their command when the activity is outside the scope of mission orders and rules of engagement. Each commanding officer is responsible for writing and maintaining policies simple enough to be understood by everyone in their command. Each commanding officer is responsible for ensuring that command policy documents are made available to every person in their command (civilian, military, and contractor). The commanding officer is responsible for disciplinary action and public disclosures when policies are violated within their command.

The commanding officer shares responsibilities for crimes that are not punished (dereliction).

Military agencies operate independently of law enforcement, judicial authority, and common law. Similar exemptions exist for some state agencies.

Potential crimes are investigated by military police. The following is an example of the kinds of policy documents used to conduct criminal investigations.

Because military law enforcement is performed with no independent civilian oversight, there is an inherent conflict of interest. Information and disclosures are obtained through Freedom of Information Act request and not through disclosures ordinarily associated with the EPA and OSHA that have the competency required for training, certification, disclosure, and enforcement. This prevents physicians from obtaining the kind of information needed to diagnose and treat environmental illness, so the root cause for environmental illness typically remains permanently unknown. The following organization may help when the root cause for an illness remains unknown longer than 30 days.

Criminal violations, injuries, and potential enforcement actions begin by exchanging information in the following venues when civilian government employees and flag officers are unable to deal with the situation in an ethical manner.

- Local labor union officials
- Freedom of information in the United States
- Equal Employment Opportunity Commission
- Office of the Inspector General, U.S. Department of Defense (Hotline)
- United States Secretary of Defense
- President of the United States
- United States Secretary of State
- United States House of Representatives
- United States Senate

US federal laws, state laws, local laws, foreign laws, and treaty agreements may not apply.

Policies are established by Executive Order and not public law, except for interventions by the United States Congress and interventions by US district courts.

The following US presidential executive orders establish the requirements for DoD environmental policy for government organizations within the executive branch of the United States.

- Executive Order 12114 - Environmental effects abroad of major Federal actions
- Executive Order 12196 - Occupational safety and health programs for Federal employees
- Executive Order 12291 - Regulatory planning process
- Executive Order 12344 - Naval Nuclear Propulsion Program
- Executive Order 12898 - Federal Actions To Address Environmental Justice in Minority Populations and Low-Income Populations
- Executive Order 12958 - Classified National Security Information
- Executive Order 12960 - Amendments to the Manual for Courts-Martial
- Executive Order 12961 - Presidential Advisory Committee on Gulf War Veterans' Illnesses
- Executive Order 13101 - Greening the Government Through Waste Prevention, Recycling, and Federal Acquisition
- Executive Order 13148 - Greening the Government Through Leadership in Environmental Management
- Executive Order 13151 - Global Disaster Information Network
- Executive Order 13388 - Further Strengthening the Sharing of Terrorism Information to Protect American
- Executive Order 12656 - Assignment of emergency preparedness responsibilities
- Executive Order 13423 - Strengthening Federal Environmental, Energy, and Transportation Management
- Executive Order 13526 - Classified National Security Information Memorandum

The following unclassified documents provide further information for programs managed by the United States Secretary of Defense.

- DoD Directive 3150.08 - DoD Response to Nuclear and Radiological Incidents
- DoD Directive 3222.3 - DoD Electromagnetic Environmental Effects (E3)
- Directive 4715.1 - Environment, Safety, and Occupational Health (ESOH)
- DoD Directive 4715.3 - Environmental Conservation Program
- DoD Directive 4715.5 - Management of Environmental Compliance at Overseas Installations
- Directive 4715.8 - Environmental Remediation for DoD Activities Overseas
- DoD Directive 4715.11 - Environmental and Explosives Safety Management on Operational Ranges Within the United States
- DoD Directive 4715.12 - Environmental and Explosives Safety Management on Operational Ranges Outside the United States
- DoD Directive 6050.07 - Environmental Effects Abroad of Major Department of Defense Actions

=== Available information ===
The information described in this section is for the United States, but most countries have similar regulatory requirements.

Two mandatory documents must provide hazard information for most toxic products.

- Product Label
- Safety Data Sheet

Product label requirements are established by the Federal Insecticide, Fungicide, and Rodenticide Act under the authority of the United States Environmental Protection Agency. As a minimum this requires information about the chemical makeup of the product, instructions required for the safe use of the product, and contact information for the manufacturer of the product.

- Title 40 CFR --Protection of Environment (parts 150 to 189) CHAPTER I--ENVIRONMENTAL PROTECTION AGENCY

A Safety Data Sheet is required under the authority of the United States Occupational Safety and Health Administration for hazardous materials to communicate health and safety risks needed by health care professionals and emergency responders.

- Title 29: Labor PART 1910—OCCUPATIONAL SAFETY AND HEALTH STANDARDS Subpart Z—Toxic and Hazardous Substances

A summary of workers rights is available from OSHA.

Chemical information is most frequently associated with the right to know but there are many other types of information that are important to workplace safety and health. The following sources of information are those most likely to be found at the workplace or in state or federal agencies with jurisdiction over the workplace:

- Injury and illness records which employers are required to keep.
- Accident investigation reports.
- Workers' compensation claim forms and records.
- Safety data sheets (SDS) and labels for hazardous chemicals used or present in the workplace.
- Chemical inventories required by federal and state regulations.
- Records of monitoring and measurement of worker exposure to chemicals, noise, radiation, or other hazards.
- Workplace inspection reports, whether done by a safety committee, employer safety and health personnel, OR-OSHA insurance carriers, fire departments, or other outside agencies.
- Job safety analysis, including ergonomic evaluations of jobs or workstations.
- Employee medical records or studies or evaluations based on these records.
- OSHA standards and the background data on which they are based.

==== Hazard Communication (HazCom 2012) ====
Note:Refer to 29 CFR 1910.1200 for the most current and updated information.

The Hazard Communication Standard first went into effect in 1985 and has since been expanded to cover almost all workplaces under OSHA jurisdiction. The details of the Hazard Communication standard are rather complicated, but the basic idea behind it is straightforward. It requires chemical manufacturers and employers to communicate information to workers about the hazards of workplace chemicals or products, including training.

The Hazard Communication standard does not specify how much training a worker must receive. Instead, it defines what the training must cover. Employers must conduct training in a language comprehensible to employees to be in compliance with the standard. It also states that workers must be trained at the time of initial assignment and whenever a new hazard is introduced into their work area. The purpose for this is so that workers can understand the hazards they face and so that they are aware of the protective measures that should be in place. It is very difficult to get a good understanding of chemical hazards and particularly to be able to read SDSs in the short amount of time that many companies devote to hazard communication training. When OSHA conducts an inspection, the inspector will evaluate the effectiveness of the training by reviewing records of what training was done and by interviewing employees who use chemicals to find out what they understand about the hazards.

The United States Department of Transportation (DOT) regulates hazmat transportation within the territory of the US by Title 49 of the Code of Federal Regulations.

- Dangerous Goods

All chemical manufacturers and importers must assess the hazards of the chemicals they produce and import and pass this information on to transportation workers and purchasers through labels and Safety Data Sheets (SDSs). Employers whose employees may be exposed to hazardous chemicals on the job must provide hazardous chemical information to those employees through the use of SDSs, properly labeled containers, training, and a written hazard communication program. This standard also requires the employer to maintain a list of all hazardous chemicals used in the workplace. The SDSs for these chemicals must be kept current and they must be made available and accessible to employees in their work areas.

Chemicals that may pose health risks or those that are physical hazards (such as fire or explosion) are covered. List of chemicals that are considered hazardous are maintained according to the use or purpose. There are several existing sources that manufacturers and employers may consult. These include:

- Any substance for which OSHA has a standard in force, including any substance listed in the Air Contaminants regulation.
- Substances listed as carcinogens (causing cancer) by the National Toxicology Program (NTP) or the International Agency for Research on Cancer (IARC).
- Substances listed in the Threshold Limit Values for Chemical Substances and Physical Agents, published by the American Conference of Governmental Industrial Hygienists (ACGIH).
- Restricted Use Products (RUP) Report; EPA

Ultimately, it is up to the manufacturer to disclose hazards.

There are other sources of information about chemicals used in industry as a result of state and federal laws regarding the Community Right to Know Act.

The Air Resources Board is responsible for public hazard disclosures in California. Pesticide use disclosures are made by each pest control supervisor to the County Agricultural Commission. Epidemiology information is available from the California Pesticide Information Portal, which can be used by health care professionals to identify the cause for environmental illness.

Under the Oregon Community Right to Know Act (ORS 453.307-372) and the federal Superfund Amendments and Reauthorization Act (SARA) Title III, the Office of the State Fire Marshal collects information on hazardous substances and makes it available to emergency responders and to the general public. Among the information which companies must report are:

- Inventories of amounts and types of hazardous substances stored in their facilities.
- Annual inventories of toxic chemicals released during normal operations.
- Emergency notification of accidental releases of certain chemicals listed by the Environmental Protection Agency.

The information can be obtained in the form of an annual report of releases for the state or for specific companies. It is available on request from the Fire Marshal's Office and is normally free of charge unless unusually large quantities of data are involved.

==== Chemical labeling requirements ====
Each container that contains a hazardous chemical must be labeled by the manufacturer or distributor before it is sent to downstream users. There is no single standard format for labels. Each product must be labeled according to the specific type of hazard.

Pesticide labeling is regulated by the Environmental Protection Agency.

- The identity of the hazardous chemical(s) by common or chemical name.
- Appropriate hazard warnings.
- The name and address of the manufacturer, distributor, or the responsible party.
- Product use instructions

Employers are required to inform the public of:

- The requirements of the Hazard Communication rules.
- The operations in their work area where hazardous materials are present.
- The location of the written hazard communication program, the list of hazardous chemicals, and the SDSs of chemicals that people will be exposed to.

In addition, these items must be covered in training:

- Methods to detect the presence of hazardous chemicals.
- Physical and health hazards of the chemicals.
- Protective measures, including work practices, ventilation, personal protective equipment, and emergency procedures.
- How to read and understand labels and SDSs.
- The hazards of non-routine tasks, such as the cleaning of tanks or other vessels, or breaking into lines containing chemicals.

==== Safety Data Sheet (SDS): Formerly known as Material Safety Data Sheet (SDS) as per OSHA's Hazard Communication Standard ====
Note: Refer to 29 CFR 1910.1200 for the most current and updated information (https://www.osha.gov/pls/oshaweb/owadisp.show_document?p_table=standards&p_id=10099)

SDSs information is required by EPA, OSHA, DOT, and/or DOE regulations depending upon the type of hazardous substance. The Safety Data Sheet includes the following information.

1. Product identity and ingredients by chemical or common name.
2. Physical and chemical characteristics.
3. Physical hazards, such as fire and explosion.
4. Health hazards, including symptoms.
5. Primary routes of entry of the chemical into the body.
6. Legal exposure limits (OSHA and other recommended limits).
7. Whether the chemical can cause cancer.
8. Precautions for safe handling and use.
9. Control measures, including ventilation, personal protective equipment, etc.
10. Emergency and first aid procedures.
11. The date the SDS was prepared.
12. Name, address, and phone number of the manufacturer.
13. Regulatory agencies, such as United States Environmental Protection Agency EPA SARA Title III rules EPCRA

Chemical manufacturers may legally withhold the specific chemical identity of a material from the SDS and label in the case of bona fide trade secrets. In such cases the following rules apply:

- The SDS must indicate that trade secret information is being withheld.
- The SDS must disclose information concerning the properties and effects of the hazardous chemical, even if the actual chemical identity is withheld.
- The trade secret information must be disclosed to a doctor or nurse in a medical emergency.
- In non-emergency cases health professionals can obtain a trade secret chemical identity if they can show they need it for purposes of health protection and if they sign a confidentiality agreement.

==== Exposure records ====
The Hazard Communication standard requires that chemical information must be transmitted to employees who work with hazardous materials. Employee exposure records can tell if a worker is actually being exposed to a chemical or physical hazard and how much exposure he or she is receiving. OSHA regulations that establish access rights to these records are found in 29 CFR 1910.1020: Access to Medical and Exposure Records. This information is usually the product of some type of monitoring or measurement for:

- Dusts, fumes, or gases in the air
- Absorption of a chemical into the body, e.g. blood lead levels
- Noise exposure
- Radiation exposure
- Spores, fungi, or other biological contaminants

Employees and their designated representatives have the right under OR-OSHA regulations to examine or copy exposure records that are in the possession of the employer. This right applies not only to records of an employee's own exposure to chemical, physical, or biological agents but also to exposure records of other employees whose working conditions are similar to the employee's. Union representatives have the right to see records for any work areas in which the union represents employees.

In addition to seeing the results, employees and their representatives also have the right to observe the actual measurement of hazardous chemical or noise exposure.

Exposure records that are part of an OR-OSHA inspection file are also accessible to employees and union representatives. In fact these files, with the exception of certain confidential information, are open to the public after the inspection has been legally closed out.

==== Medical records ====
Many employers keep some type of medical records. These could be medical questionnaires, results of pre-employment physical examinations, results from blood tests or more elaborate records of ongoing diagnosis or treatment (such as all biological monitoring not defined as an employee exposure record). OSHA regulations that establish access rights to these records are found in CFR 1910.1020: Access to Medical and Exposure Records.

Medical records are considerably more personal than exposure records or accident reports so the rules governing confidentiality and access to them are stricter. Employee medical records do not include a lot of employee medical information because of this extra scrutiny. A good rule of thumb is that if the information is maintained separately from the employer's medical program, it probably will not be accessible.

Examples of separately maintained medical information would be records of voluntary employee assistance programs (alcohol, drug abuse, or personal counseling programs), medical records concerning health insurance claims or records created solely in preparation for litigation.

These records are often kept at the worksite if there is an on-site physician or nurse. They could also be in the files of a physician, clinic, or hospital with whom the employer contracts for medical services.

An employee has access to his or her own medical record (29 CFR 1910.1020). An individual employee may also sign a written release authorizing a designated representative (such as a union representative) to receive access to his or her medical record. The latter might occur in a case where the union or a physician or other researcher working for the union or employer needs medical information on a whole group of workers to document a health problem. Certain confidential information may be deleted from an employee's record before it is released.

== Past and future ==
The push towards greater availability of information came from events that killed many and infected others with toxins, such as the Bhopal disaster in India in December 1984. During the Bhopal disaster, a cloud of methyl isocyanate escaped an insecticide plant due to neglect, and as a result, 2,000 people were killed and many more were injured. The plant had been already noted for its poor safety record and lack of evacuation or emergency plan. The lack of awareness and knowledge in the community about the dangers led to this disaster, which could have been avoided.

Shortly after, the Emergency Planning and Right to Know Act of 1986, originally introduced by California Democrat Henry Waxman, was passed. This act was the first official step taken to help people become more educated in the field of corporation's pollutants and their actions. The act issued a requirement for industrial facilities across the U.S. to disclose information on their annual releases of toxic chemicals. This data collected is made available by the Environmental Protection Agency in the Toxics Release Inventory (TRI) which is open to public knowledge. This was noticed as a step in the right direction however, only pounds of individual pollutants were required to be released as a result of this act. No information about toxicity, spread, or overlap had been required to be shared with the public.

In years to come, the public achieved greater ways of accessing the information that corporations with excess pollutants withheld. The Toxic 100 is a form of newer information which is a list that includes one hundred companies industrial air polluters in the United States that are ranked by the quantity of pollution they produce and the toxicity of the pollutants. This data is determined by the Political Economy Research Institute (PERI) and calculated with factors such as winds carrying the pollution, height of smokestacks, and how much it impacts nearby communities.

== See also ==
- International Day for Universal Access to Information
- Access to public information in Europe
- Freedom of information
- Informed consent
