= Signal Word =

Signal word may refer to:

- A type of warning label in a Toxicity Class regulatory system
- Word (computer architecture), a fixed-sized group of bits handled as a unit by a computer processor
- A fixed-sized group of bits handled as a unit by asynchronous serial communication hardware
- Something in a complete sentence referring to an emotion to give info and explain sentences.
