= Xenobiotic =

Foreign chemical substance found within an organism

A xenobiotic is a chemical substance found within an organism that is not naturally produced or expected to be present within the organism. It can also cover substances that are present in much higher concentrations than are usual. Natural compounds can also become xenobiotics if they are taken up by another organism, such as the uptake of natural human hormones by fish found downstream of sewage treatment plant outfalls, or the chemical defenses produced by some organisms as protection against predators. The term "xenobiotic" is also used to refer to organs transplanted from one species to another.

The term "xenobiotics", however, is very often used in the context of pollutants such as dioxins and polychlorinated biphenyls and their effect on the biota, because xenobiotics are understood as substances foreign to an entire biological system, i.e. artificial substances, which did not exist in nature before their synthesis by humans. The term xenobiotic is derived from the Greek words ξένος (xenos) = foreigner, stranger and βίος (bios) = life, plus the Greek suffix for adjectives -τικός, -ή, -όν (-tikos, -ē, -on). Xenobiotics may be grouped as carcinogens, drugs, environmental pollutants, food additives, hydrocarbons, and pesticides.

== Xenobiotic metabolism ==
The body removes xenobiotics by xenobiotic metabolism. This consists of the deactivation and the excretion of xenobiotics and happens mostly in the liver. Excretion routes are urine, feces, breath, and sweat. Hepatic enzymes are responsible for the metabolism of xenobiotics by first activating them (oxidation, reduction, hydrolysis, and/or hydration of the xenobiotic), and then conjugating the active secondary metabolite with glucuronic acid, sulfuric acid, or glutathione, followed by excretion in bile or urine. An example of a group of enzymes involved in xenobiotic metabolism is hepatic microsomal cytochrome P450. These enzymes that metabolize xenobiotics are very important for the pharmaceutical industry because they are responsible for the breakdown of medications. A species with this unique cytochrome P450 system is Drosophila mettleri, which uses xenobiotic resistance to exploit a wider nesting range including both soil moistened with necrotic exudates and necrotic plots themselves.

Although the body is able to remove xenobiotics by reducing it to a less toxic form through xenobiotic metabolism then excreting it, it is also possible for it to be converted into a more toxic form in some cases. This process is referred to as bioactivation and can result in structural and functional changes to the microbiota. Exposure to xenobiotics can disrupt the microbiome community structure, either by increasing or decreasing the size of certain bacterial populations depending on the substance. Functional changes that result vary depending on the substance and can include increased expression in genes involved in stress response and antibiotic resistance, changes in the levels of metabolites produced, etc.

Organisms can also evolve to tolerate xenobiotics. An example is the co-evolution of the production of tetrodotoxin in the rough-skinned newt and the evolution of tetrodotoxin resistance in its predator, the Common Garter Snake. In this predator–prey pair, an evolutionary arms race has produced high levels of toxin in the newt and correspondingly high levels of resistance in the snake. This evolutionary response is based on the snake evolving modified forms of the ion channels that the toxin acts upon, so becoming resistant to its effects. Another example of a xenobiotic tolerance mechanism is the use of ATP-binding cassette (ABC) transporters, which is largely exhibited in insects. Such transporters contribute to resistance by enabling the transport of toxins across the cell membrane, thus preventing accumulation of these substances within cells.

== Xenobiotics in the environment ==
Xenobiotic substances are an issue for sewage treatment systems, since they are many in number, and each will present its own problems as to how to remove them (and whether it is worth trying to)

Some xenobiotics substances are resistant to degradation. Xenobiotics such as polychlorinated biphenyls (PCBs), polycyclic aromatic hydrocarbons (PAHs), and trichloroethylene (TCE) accumulate in the environment due to their recalcitrant properties and have become an environmental concern due to their toxicity and accumulation. This occurs particularly in the subsurface environment and water sources, as well as in biological systems, having the potential to impact human health. Some of the main sources of pollution and the introduction of xenobiotics into the environment come from large industries such as pharmaceuticals, fossil fuels, pulp and paper bleaching and agriculture. For example, they may be synthetic organochlorides such as plastics and pesticides, or naturally occurring organic chemicals such as polyaromatic hydrocarbons (PAHs) and some fractions of crude oil and coal.

Microorganisms may be a viable solution to this issue of environmental pollution by the degradation of the xenobiotics; a process known as bioremediation. Microorganisms are able to adapt to xenobiotics introduced into the environment through horizontal gene transfer, in order to make use of such compounds as energy sources. This process can be further altered to manipulate the metabolic pathways of microorganisms in order to degrade harmful xenobiotics under specific environmental conditions at a more desirable rate. Mechanisms of bioremediation include both genetically engineering microorganisms and isolating the naturally occurring xenobiotic degrading microbes. Research has been conducted to identify the genes responsible for the ability of microorganisms to metabolize certain xenobiotics and it has been suggested that this research can be used in order to engineer microorganisms specifically for this purpose. Not only can current pathways be engineered to be expressed in other organisms, but the creation of novel pathways is a possible approach.

Xenobiotics may be limited in the environment and difficult to access in areas such as the subsurface environment. Degradative organisms can be engineered to increase mobility in order to access these compounds, including enhanced chemotaxis. One limitation of the bioremediation process is that optimal conditions are required for proper metabolic functioning of certain microorganisms, which may be difficult to meet in an environmental setting. In some cases a single microorganism may not be capable of performing all metabolic processes required for degradation of a xenobiotic compound and so "syntrophic bacterial consortia" may be employed. In this case, a group of bacteria work in conjunction, resulting in dead end products from one organism being further degraded by another organism. In other cases, the products of one microorganisms may inhibit the activity another, and thus a balance must be maintained.

Many xenobiotics produce a variety of biological effects, which is used when they are characterized using bioassay. Before they can be registered for sale in most countries, xenobiotic pesticides must undergo extensive evaluation for risk factors, such as toxicity to humans, ecotoxicity, or persistence in the environment. For example, during the registration process, the herbicide, cloransulam-methyl was found to degrade relatively quickly in soil.

== Inter-species organ transplantation ==
The term xenobiotic is also used to refer to organs transplanted from one species to another. For example, some researchers hope that hearts and other organs could be transplanted from pigs to humans. Many people die every year whose lives could have been saved if a critical organ had been available for transplant. Kidneys are currently the most commonly transplanted organ. Xenobiotic organs would need to be developed in such a way that they would not be rejected by the immune system.

== See also ==
Drug metabolism – Xenobiotic metabolism is redirected to the special case: Drug metabolism.

- Detoxification
- Foreign body
