= Toxicity label =

Labels on pesticide containers

Toxicity labels
- Red, yellow, blue and green labels.
- Effective region: India
- Effective since: 1971
- Product category: Pesticides
- Legal status: Mandatory
- Mandatory since: 1971

Toxicity labels viz; red label, yellow label, blue label and green label are mandatory labels employed on pesticide containers in India identifying the level of toxicity (that is, the toxicity class) of the contained pesticide. The schemes follows from the Insecticides Act of 1968 and the Insecticides Rules of 1971.

The labeling follows a general scheme as laid down in the Insecticides Rules, 1971, and contains information such as brand name, name of manufacturer, name of the antidote in case of accidental consumption etc. A major aspect of the label is a color mark which represents the toxicity of the material by a color code. Thus the labelling scheme proposes four different colour labels: viz red, yellow, blue, and green.

Label	Name	Level of toxicity	Oral lethal dose (mg/kg)	Listed chemicals
	Red label	Extremely toxic	1–50	Monocrotophos, zinc phosphide, ethyl mercury acetate, and others.
	Yellow label	Highly toxic	51–500	Endosulfan, carbaryl, quinalphos, and others.
	Blue label	Moderately toxic	501–5000	Malathion, thiram, glyphosate, and others.
	Green label	Slightly toxic	> 5000	Mancozeb, oxyfluorfen, mosquito repellant oils and liquids, and most other household insecticides.

The toxicity classification applies only to pesticides which are allowed to be sold in India. Some of the classified pesticides may be banned in some states of India, by decision of the state governments. Some of the red-label and yellow-label pesticides were banned in the state of Kerala following the Endosulfan protests of 2011.

== See also ==
- Toxicity class listing international regulations outside India
