= Monsanto Co. v. Durnell =

Monsanto v. Durnell
- Supreme Court of the United States

Argued April 27, 2026 Decided June 25, 2026
- Full case name: Monsanto v. Durnell
- Docket no.: 24-1068

Holding
- The Federal Insecticide, Fungicide, and Rodenticide Act preempts a state-law labeling requirement that differs from the federal labeling requirements imposed under FIFRA.

Court membership
- Chief Justice John Roberts Associate Justices Clarence Thomas · Samuel Alito; Sonia Sotomayor · Elena Kagan; Neil Gorsuch · Brett Kavanaugh; Amy Coney Barrett · Ketanji Brown Jackson

Case opinions
- Majority: Kavanaugh, joined by Roberts, Thomas, Alito, Sotomayor, Kagan, Barrett
- Concurrence: Thomas
- Dissent: Jackson, joined by Gorsuch

Laws applied
- Federal Insecticide, Fungicide, and Rodenticide Act

Monsanto v. Durnell was a United States Supreme Court case regarding whether companies have a duty to warn users if their products contain risks identified by state laws when not identified as risks at the federal level.

The case is centered on Roundup herbicide, produced by Monsanto. While the Environmental Protection Agency has not determined Roundup to be a carcinogen, multiple states have established requirements through laws that the products must be labelled as such based on other scientific studies, including one published in 2015 by the International Agency for Research on Cancer. Thousands of lawsuits have been filed in state courts, seeking damages from Monsanto for those that used the product without the state-mandated labeling and have developed cancer. Monsanto along with the federal government argued that state laws should not preempt federal requirements for consistent labeling on packaging across the country set by Federal Insecticide, Fungicide, and Rodenticide Act. A circuit split led to the case being heard by the Supreme Court.

In a 7-2 decision issued in June 2026, the Supreme Court ruled in favor of Bayer and Monsanto, ruling that the Missouri state law cannot override the EPA's uniform labeling requirements since the EPA had yet to identify the product as carcinogenic. The ruling overturned a prior jury award and is expected to end most other ongoing litigation over Roundup.

== Background ==
Roundup, a glyphosate-based herbicide (GBH) was developed by Monsanto in the 1970s with commercial sales launching in 1974. Around two decades later, Monsanto had developed genetically modified crops that could withstand exposure to the glyphosate in Roundup, greatly expanding its use as a herbicide. Bayer acquired Monsanto in 2018.

There is limited evidence human cancer risk might increase as a result of occupational exposure to large amounts of glyphosate, such as agricultural work, but no good evidence of such a risk from home use, such as in domestic gardening. The consensus among national pesticide regulatory agencies and scientific organizations is that labeled uses of glyphosate have demonstrated no evidence of human carcinogenicity. One international scientific organization, the International Agency for Research on Cancer (IARC), affiliated with the World Health Organization (WHO), has made claims of carcinogenicity in research reviews; in 2015 the IARC declared glyphosate "probably carcinogenic to humans."

Separately, the United States Environmental Protection Agency (EPA) had classified glyphosate as "not likely to be carcinogenic to humans" in a 2020 report. This finding was challenged in courts, and in 2022, the Ninth Circuit ordered the EPA to reevaluate its findings. The EPA said it expected to reissue its evaluation of glyphosate in 2026, which by April 27, 2026, it had yet to complete; Roundup remained available for sale during this period.

The IARC's classification brought over 100,000 lawsuits against Monsanto and Bayer, most from household consumers that had used Roundup for years and had developed Non-Hodgkin lymphoma (NHL) and other medical issues. After several of these cases resulted in decisions for the plaintiffs, Bayer opted to settle most of the remaining ones in 2020, establishing a $10 billion fund to complete the settlements, though leaving around 40,000 cases still to be resolved and more continued to be filed in the following years. A circuit split developed from these cases. Bayer also removed glyphosate from its consumer version of Roundup, though still remained in Roundup sold to agriculture.

In the specific case here, John Durnell was a farmer in Missouri that had used Roundup for decades and developed NHL. He sued Monsanto and Bayer on their failure to warn that the Roundup product was possibly carcinogenic. In 2023, a jury at the state level found for Durnell, awarding him $1.25 million. The trial was one of the first ones to acknowledge that other products in Roundup beyond glyphosate were potentially carcinogenic. Bayer appealed, arguing that the federal Federal Insecticide, Fungicide, and Rodenticide Act (FIFRA) states that labelling must only respect the EPA's designation of herbicides and cannot be overridden by state law, and thus would prevent lawsuits like Durnell's from being filed. The Missouri Court of Appeals rejected Bayer's appeal in 2025.

== Supreme Court ==
In January 2026, the Court granted certiorari. Oral arguments before the Court took place on April 27, 2026. Paul Clement represented Monsanto and Sarah Harris of the Department of Justice supported Monsanto as an amicus curiae. Ashley Keller represented Durnell, the respondent.

The Court released its decision on June 25, 2026, ruling for Monsanto with a 7-2 split. Justice Brett Kavanaugh wrote for the majority, with Justices John Roberts, Clarence Thomas, Samuel Alito, Sonia Sotomayor, Elena Kagan and Amy Coney Barrett joining. Kavanaugh's opinion said that state laws cannot override the universal labelling requirement set by FIFRA. Kavanaugh said that, under FIFRA, "undertakes an extensive review of the pesticide and its proposed labeling" and "determine[s] that the proposed label includes all warnings necessary and adequate to protect human health and the environment." Because the EPA had yet to determine the glyphosates are carcinogenic, then under FIFRA, "the manufacturer is required to use" the labeling standard set by the EPA. The majority opinion dismissed Durnell's failure-to-warn claim as preempted by FIFRA.

Thomas wrote a concurring opinion, expressing concern that FIFRA may exceed congressional authority for the delegation of powers, arguing that regulation of agriculture and manufacturing falls outside the scope of the Commerce Clause.

Justice Ketanji Brown Jackson was joined by Justice Neil Gorsuch in her dissent. Jackson wrote "In accepting Monsanto’s argument and holding that Durnell's failure-to-warn claim is preempted, the Court misunderstands FIFRA's requirements, misinterprets the scope of FIFRA’s preemption, and ultimately leaves Durnell without a remedy for the significant harms he has suffered." She said in the dissent that while states cannot regulate labels for pesticides, the law does not remove their authority to require a labeling requirement equivalent to FIFRA's requirements.

The decision is expected to end most ongoing lawsuits over Roundup, though Bayer says they will still complete the planned $10 billion settlement fund. A federal district judge approved of a total $7.25 billion settlement fund in November 2026.

== See also ==
- Monsanto legal cases
