= Special review =

Special review, formerly known as Rebuttable Presumption Against Registration (RPAR), is a regulatory process in the United States through which existing pesticides suspected of posing unreasonable risks to human health, non-target organisms, or the environment are referred for review by the EPA. Such review requires an intensive risk/benefit analysis with opportunity for public comment. If risk is found to outweigh social and economic benefits, regulatory actions (ranging from label revisions and use-restriction to cancellation or suspended registration) can be initiated.

== See also ==
- Pesticide regulation in the United States
