= Endosulfan =

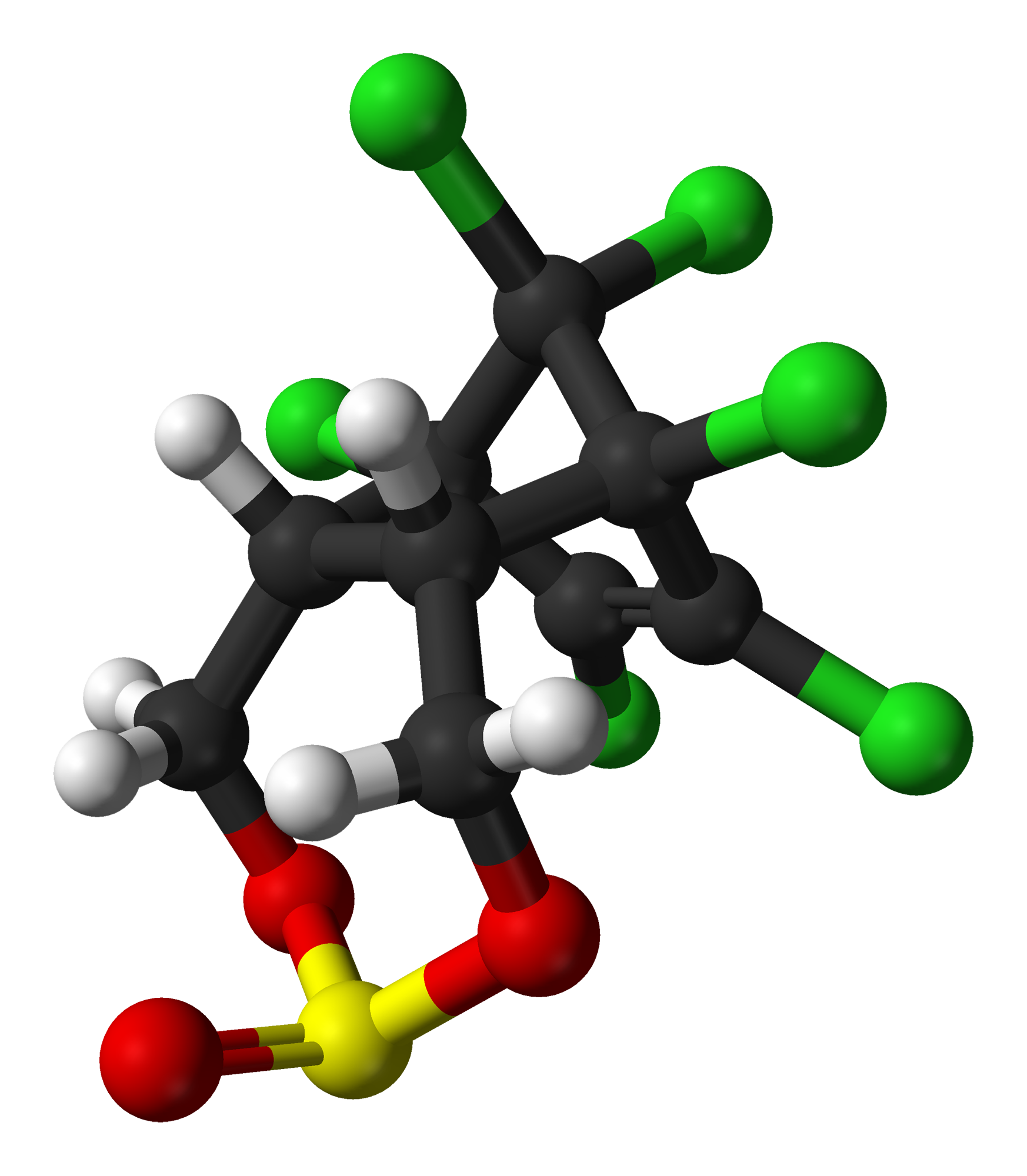

Names
- IUPAC name 6,7,8,9,10,10-Hexachloro-1,5,5a,6,9,9a-hexahydro- 6,9-methano-2,4,3-benzodioxathiepine-3-oxide
- Other names Benzoepin, Endocel, Parrysulfan, Phaser, Thiodan, Thionex

Identifiers
| CAS Number | 115-29-7 |
| 3D model (JSmol) | Interactive image |
| Beilstein Reference | 1262315 |
| ChEBI | CHEBI:4791 |
| ChEMBL | ChEMBL194399 |
| ChemSpider | 21117730 |
| ECHA InfoCard | 100.003.709 |
| EC Number | 204-079-4 |
| KEGG | C11090 |
| PubChem CID | 3224 |
| RTECS number | RB9275000 |
| UNII | OKA6A6ZD4K |
| UN number | 2761 |
| CompTox Dashboard (EPA) | DTXSID1020560 |
- InChI: InChI=1S/C9H6Cl6O3S/c10-5-6(11)8(13)4-2-18-19(16)17-1-3(4)7(5,12)9(8,14)15/h3-4H,1-2H2/t3-,4-,7-,8+,19+/m0/s1 Key: RDYMFSUJUZBWLH-QDLMHMFQSA-N; InChI=1/C9H6Cl6O3S/c10-5-6(11)8(13)4-2-18-19(16)17-1-3(4)7(5,12)9(8,14)15/h3-4H,1-2H2 Key: RDYMFSUJUZBWLH-UHFFFAOYAH; InChI=1/C9H6Cl6O3S/c10-5-6(11)8(13)4-2-18-19(16)17-1-3(4)7(5,12)9(8,14)15/h3-4H,1-2H2/t3-,4-,7-,8+,19+/m0/s1 Key: RDYMFSUJUZBWLH-QDLMHMFQBI
- SMILES: Cl[C@@]3(Cl)[C@]1(Cl)C(/Cl)=C(/Cl)[C@@]3(Cl)[C@H]2[C@@H2]OS(=O)O[C@@H2][C@H]12

Properties
| Chemical formula | C_{9}H_{6}Cl_{6}O_{3}S |
| Molar mass | 406.90 g·mol^{−1} |
| Appearance | Brown crystals |
| Odor | slight sulfur dioxide odor |
| Density | 1.745 g/cm^{3} |
| Melting point | 70 to 100 °C (158 to 212 °F; 343 to 373 K) |
| Boiling point | decomposes |
| Solubility in water | 0.33 mg/L |
| Vapor pressure | 0.00001 mmHg (25 °C) |

Hazards
- Occupational safety and health (OHS/OSH)
| Main hazards | T, Xi, N |
- GHS labelling
| Pictograms | (GHS06: Toxic) (GHS07: Exclamation mark) (GHS09: Environmental hazard) |
| Signal word | Danger |
| Hazard statements | H301, H302, H410 |
| Precautionary statements | P264, P270, P273, P301+P310, P301+P312, P321, P330, P391, P405, P501 |
| NFPA 704 (fire diamond) | 2 1 0 |
| Flash point | noncombustible |
- NIOSH (US health exposure limits)
| PEL (Permissible) | none |
| REL (Recommended) | TWA 0.1 mg/m^{3} [skin] |
| IDLH (Immediate danger) | N.D. |
- Except where otherwise noted, data are given for materials in their standard state (at 25 °C [77 °F], 100 kPa). verify (what is ?) Infobox references

Endosulfan is an organochlorine insecticide and acaricide, which acts by blocking the GABA-gated chloride channel of the insect (IRAC group 2A). It became highly controversial due to its acute toxicity, potential for bioaccumulation, and role as an endocrine disruptor. Because of its threats to human health and the environment, a global ban on the manufacture and use of endosulfan was negotiated under the Stockholm Convention in April 2011. The ban took effect in mid-2012, with certain uses exempted for five additional years. More than 80 countries, including the European Union, Australia, New Zealand, several West African nations, the United States, Brazil, and Canada had already banned it or announced phase-outs by the time the Stockholm Convention ban was agreed upon. It is still used extensively in India and China despite laws against its use. It is also used in a few other countries. It is produced by the Israeli firm Makhteshim Agan and several manufacturers in India and China. On May 13, 2011, the India Supreme Court ordered a ban on the production and sale of endosulfan in India, pending further notice.

== Uses ==
Endosulfan has been used in agriculture around the world to control insect pests including whiteflies, aphids, leafhoppers, Colorado potato beetles and cabbage worms. Due to its unique mode of action, it is useful in resistance management; however, as it is not specific, it can negatively impact populations of beneficial insects. It is, however, considered to be moderately toxic to honey bees, and it is less toxic to bees than organophosphate insecticides.

== Production ==
The World Health Organization estimated worldwide annual production to be about 9,000 tonnes (t) in the early 1980s. By 2004, worldwide annual production had risen to 12,800 tonnes per year.

Endosulfan is a derivative of hexachlorocyclopentadiene, and is chemically similar to aldrin, chlordane, and heptachlor. Specifically, it is produced by the Diels-Alder reaction of hexachlorocyclopentadiene with cis-butene-1,4-diol and subsequent reaction of the adduct with thionyl chloride. Technical endosulfan is a 7:3 mixture of stereoisomers, designated α and β. α- and β-Endosulfan are configurational isomers arising from the pyramidal stereochemistry of the tetravalent sulfur. α-Endosulfan is the more thermodynamically stable of the two, thus β-endosulfan irreversibly converts to the α form, although the conversion is slow.

== History of commercialization and regulation ==
- Early 1950s: Endosulfan was developed.
- 1954: Hoechst AG (now Sanofi) won USDA approval for the use of endosulfan in the United States.
- 2000: Home and garden use in the United States was terminated by agreement with the EPA.
- 2002: The U.S. Fish and Wildlife Service recommended that endosulfan registration should be cancelled, and the EPA determined that endosulfan residues on food and in water pose unacceptable risks. The agency allowed endosulfan to stay on the US market, but imposed restrictions on its agricultural uses.
- 2007: International steps were taken to restrict the use and trade of endosulfan. It is recommended for inclusion in the Rotterdam Convention on Prior Informed Consent, and the European Union proposed inclusion in the list of chemicals banned under the Stockholm Convention on Persistent Organic Pollutants. Such inclusion would ban all use and manufacture of endosulfan globally. Meanwhile, the Canadian government announced that endosulfan was under consideration for phase-out, and Bayer CropScience voluntarily pulled its endosulfan products from the U.S. market but continues to sell the products elsewhere.
- 2008: In February, environmental, consumer, and farm labor groups including the Natural Resources Defense Council, Organic Consumers Association, and the United Farm Workers called on the U.S. EPA to ban endosulfan. In May, coalitions of scientists, environmental groups, and arctic tribes asked the EPA to cancel endosulfan, and in July a coalition of environmental and workers groups filed a lawsuit against the EPA challenging its 2002 decision to not ban it. In October, the Review Committee of the Stockholm Convention moved endosulfan along in the procedure for listing under the treaty, while India blocked its addition to the Rotterdam Convention.
- 2009: The Stockholm Convention's Persistent Organic Pollutants Review Committee (POPRC) agreed that endosulfan is a persistent organic pollutant and that "global action is warranted", setting the stage of a global ban. New Zealand banned endosulfan.
- 2010: The POPRC nominated endosulfan to be added to the Stockholm Convention at the Conference of Parties (COP) in April 2011, which would result in a global ban. The EPA announced that the registration of endosulfan in the U.S. will be cancelled Australia banned the use of the chemical.
- 2011: The Supreme Court of India banned manufacture, sale, and use of toxic pesticide endosulfan in India. The apex court said the ban would remain effective for eight weeks during which an expert committee headed by DG, ICMR, will give an interim report to the court about the harmful effect of the widely used pesticide.
- 2011: the Argentinian Service for Sanity and Agroalimentary Quality (SENASA) decided on August 8 that the import of endosulfan into the South American country will be banned from July 1, 2012, and its commercialization and use from July 1, 2013. In the meantime, a reduced quantity can be imported and sold.

== Health effects ==
Endosulfan is alleged to be responsible for many fatal pesticide poisoning incidents around the world by NGOs opposing pesticide usage. Endosulfan is also a xenoestrogen—a synthetic substance that imitates or enhances the effect of estrogens—and it can act as an endocrine disruptor, causing reproductive and developmental damage in both animals and humans. It has also been found to act as an aromatase inhibitor. Whether endosulfan can cause cancer is debated. With regard to consumers' intake of endosulfan from residues on food, the Food and Agriculture Organization of United Nations has concluded that long-term exposure from food is unlikely to present a public health concern, but short-term exposure can exceed acute reference doses.

=== Toxicity ===
Endosulfan is acutely neurotoxic to both insects and mammals, including humans. The US EPA classifies it as Category I: "Highly Acutely Toxic" based on a LD_{50} value of 30 mg/kg for female rats, while the World Health Organization classifies it as Class II "Moderately Hazardous" based on a rat LD_{50} of 80 mg/kg. It is a GABA-gated chloride channel antagonist, and a Ca^{2+}, Mg^{2+} ATPase inhibitor. Both of these enzymes are involved in the transfer of nerve impulses. Symptoms of acute poisoning include hyperactivity, tremors, convulsions, lack of coordination, staggering, difficulty breathing, nausea and vomiting, diarrhea, and in severe cases, unconsciousness. Doses as low as 35 mg/kg have been documented to cause death in humans, and many cases of sublethal poisoning have resulted in permanent brain damage. Farm workers with chronic endosulfan exposure are at risk of rashes and skin irritation.

EPA's acute reference dose for dietary exposure to endosulfan is 0.015 mg/kg for adults and 0.0015 mg/kg for children. For chronic dietary expsoure, the EPA references doses are 0.006 mg/(kg·day) and 0.0006 mg/(kg·day) for adults and children, respectively.

=== Endocrine disruption ===
Theo Colborn, an expert on endocrine disruption, lists endosulfan as a known endocrine disruptor, and both the EPA and the Agency for Toxic Substances and Disease Registry consider endosulfan to be a potential endocrine disruptor. Numerous in vitro studies have documented its potential to disrupt hormones and animal studies have demonstrated its reproductive and developmental toxicity, especially among males. A number of studies have documented that it acts as an antiandrogen in animals. Endosulfan has shown to affect crustacean molt cycles, which are important biological and endocrine-controlled physiological processes essential for the crustacean growth and reproduction. Environmentally relevant doses of endosulfan equal to the EPA's safe dose of 0.006 mg/kg/day have been found to affect gene expression in female rats similarly to the effects of estrogen. It is not known whether endosulfan is a human teratogen (an agent that causes birth defects), though it has significant teratogenic effects in laboratory rats. A 2009 assessment concluded the endocrine disruption in rats occurs only at endosulfan doses that cause neurotoxicity.

=== Reproductive and developmental effects ===
Some studies have documented that endosulfan can also affect human development. Researchers studying children from many villages in Kasargod District, Kerala, India, have linked endosulfan exposure to delays in sexual maturity among boys. Endosulfan was the only pesticide applied to cashew plantations in the villages for 20 years, and had contaminated the village environment. The researchers compared the villagers to a control group of boys from a demographically similar village that lacked a history of endosulfan pollution. Relative to the control group, the exposed boys had high levels of endosulfan in their bodies, lower levels of testosterone, and delays in reaching sexual maturity. Birth defects of the male reproductive system, including cryptorchidism, were also more prevalent in the study group. The researchers concluded, "our study results suggest that endosulfan exposure in male children may delay sexual maturity and interfere with sex hormone synthesis." Increased incidences of cryptorchidism have been observed in other studies of endosulfan exposed populations.

A 2007 study by the California Department of Public Health found that women who lived near farm fields sprayed with endosulfan and the related organochloride pesticide dicofol during the first eight weeks of pregnancy are several times more likely to give birth to children with autism. However a 2009 assessment concluded that epidemiology and rodent studies that suggest male reproductive and autism effects are open to other interpretations, and that developmental or reproductive toxicity in rats occurs only at endosulfan doses that cause neurotoxicity.

=== Cancer ===
Endosulfan is not listed as known, probable, or possible carcinogen by the EPA, IARC, or other agencies. No epidemiological studies link exposure to endosulfan specifically to cancer in humans, but in vitro assays have shown that endosulfan can promote proliferation of human breast cancer cells. Evidence of carcinogenicity in animals is mixed.

In a 2016 study by the Department of Biochemistry, Indian Institute of Science, Bangalore published in Carcinogenesis, endosulfan was found to induce reactive oxygen species (ROS) in a concentration and time-dependent manner leading to double-stranded breaks in the DNA and also found to favour subsequent erroneous DNA repair.

== Environmental fate ==
Endosulfan is a ubiquitous environmental contaminant. The chemical is semivolatile and persistent to degradation processes in the environment. Endosulfan is subject to long-range atmospheric transport, i.e. it can travel long distances from where it is used. Thus, it occurs in many environmental compartments. For example, a 2008 report by the National Park Service found that endosulfan commonly contaminates air, water, plants, and fish of national parks in the US. Most of these parks are far from areas where endosulfan is used. Endosulfan has been found in remote locations such as the Arctic Ocean, as well as in the Antarctic atmosphere. The pesticide has also been detected in dust from the Sahara Desert collected in the Caribbean after being blown across the Atlantic Ocean. The compound has been shown to be one of the most abundant organochlorine pesticides in the global atmosphere.

The compound breaks down into endosulfan sulfate, endosulfan diol, and endosulfan furan, all of which have structures similar to the parent compound and, according to the EPA, "are also of toxicological concern...The estimated half-lives for the combined toxic residues (endosulfan plus endosulfan sulfate) [range] from roughly 9 months to 6 years." In soils, endosulfan sulfate is often the dominating compound.

The EPA concluded, "[b]ased on environmental fate laboratory studies, terrestrial field dissipation studies, available models, monitoring studies, and published literature, it can be concluded that endosulfan is a very persistent chemical which may stay in the environment for lengthy periods of time, particularly in acid media." The EPA also concluded, "[e]ndosulfan has relatively high potential to bioaccumulate in fish." It is also toxic to amphibians; low levels have been found to kill tadpoles.

In 2009, the committee of scientific experts of the Stockholm Convention concluded, "endosulfan is likely, as a result of long range environmental transport, to lead to significant adverse human health and environmental effects such that global action is warranted." In May 2011, the Stockholm Convention committee approved the recommendation for elimination of production and use of endosulfan and its isomers worldwide. This is, however, subject to certain exemptions. Overall, this will lead to its elimination from the global markets.

== Status by region ==
=== India ===
The yellow toxicity label for endosulfan in India

Although classified as a yellow label (highly toxic) pesticide by the Central Insecticides Board, India is one of the largest producers and the largest consumer of endosulfan in the world. Of the total volume manufactured in India, three companies—Excel Crop Care, Hindustan Insecticides Ltd, and Coromandal Fertilizers—produce 4,500 tonnes annually for domestic use and another 4,000 tonnes for export. Endosulfan is widely used in most of the plantation crops in India. The toxicity of endosulfan and health issues due to its bioaccumulation came under media attention when health issues precipitated in the Kasargod District (Endosulfan tragedy in Kerala) were publicised. This inspired protests, and the pesticide was banned in Kerala as early as 2001, following a report by the National Institute of Occupational Health. In the Stockholm Convention on Persistent Organic Pollutants of 2011, when an international consensus arose for the global ban of the pesticide, India opposed this move due to pressure from the endosulfan manufacturing companies. This flared up the protest, and while India still maintained its stance, the global conference decided on a global ban, for which India asked a remission for 10 years. Later, on a petition filed in the Supreme Court of India, the production, storage, sale and use of the pesticide was temporarily banned on 13 May 2011, and later permanently by the end of 2011.

The Karnataka government also banned the use of endosulfan with immediate effect. Briefing presspersons after the State Cabinet meeting, Minister for Higher Education V.S. Acharya said the Cabinet discussed the harmful effects of endosulfan on the health of farmers and people living in rural areas. The government will now invoke the provisions of the Insecticides Act, 1968 (a Central act) and write a letter to the Union Government about the ban. Minister for Energy, and Food and Civil Supplies Shobha Karandlaje, who has been spearheading a movement seeking a ban on endosulfan, said, "I am grateful to Chief Minister B.S. Yeddyurappa and members of the Cabinet for approving the ban.

Rajendra Singh Rana has written a letter to Prime Minister Manmohan Singh demanding the withdrawal of the National Institute of Occupational Health (NIOH) study on Endosulfan titled "Report Of The Investigation Of Unusual Illness" allegedly produced by the Endosulfan exposure in Padre village of Kasargod district in north Kerala. In his statement Mr. Rana said "The NIOH report is flawed. I'm in complete agreement with what the workers have to say on this. In fact, I have already made representation to the Prime Minister and concerned Union Ministers of health and environment demanding immediate withdrawal of the report," as reported by The Economic Times and Outlook India

Mrs. Vibhavari Dave, local leader and Member of Legislative Assembly (MLA), from Bhavnagar, Gujarat, voiced her concerns on the impact of ban of endosulfan on families and workers of Bhavnagar. She was a part of the delegation with Bhavnagar MP, Rajendra Singh Rana, which submitted a memorandum to the district collector's office to withdraw the NIOH report calling for ban of endosulfan. The Pollution Control Board of the Government of Kerala, prohibited the use of endosulfan in the state of Kerala on 10 November 2010. On February 18, 2011, the Karnataka government followed suit and suspended the use of endosulfan for a period of 60 days in the state. Indian Union Minister of Agriculture Sharad Pawar has ruled out implementing a similar ban at the national level despite the fact that endosulfan has banned in 63 countries, including the European Union, Australia, and New Zealand.

The Government of Gujarat had initiated a study in response to the workers' rally in Bhavnagar and representations made by Sishuvihar, an NGO based in Ahmadabad. The committee constituted for the study also included former Deputy Director of NIOH, Ahmadabad. The committee noted that the WHO, FAO, IARC and US EPA have indicated that endosulfan is not carcinogenic, not teratogenic, not mutagenic and not genotoxic. The highlight of this report is the farmer exposure study based on analysis of their blood reports for residues of endosulfan and the absence of any residues. This corroborates the lack of residues in worker-exposure studies.

The Supreme Court passed interim order on May 13, 2011, in a Writ Petition filed by Democratic Youth Federation of India, (DYFI), a youth wing of Communist Party of India (Marxist) in the backdrop of the incidents reported in Kasargode, Kerala, and banned the production, distribution and use of endosulfan in India because the pesticide has debilitating effects on humans and the environment. The Centre for Science and Environment (CSE) welcomed this order, and called it a "resounding defeat" for the pesticide industry which has been promoting this deadly toxin. A 2001 study by CSE had linked the aerial spraying of the pesticide with the growing health disorders in Kasaragode. However some scientists have called this study flawed. KM Sreekumar of the Padannakkad College of Agriculture in Kasargod and Prathapan KD of the Kerala Agricultural University in a paper claim that the extensive spread of diseases in the area cannot be solely attributed to the use of Endosulfan and criticised the CSE for inflating the level of endosulfan reported in the blood. In July 2012, the Government asked the Supreme Court to allow use of the pesticide in all states except Kerala and Karnataka, as these states are ready to use it for pest control. But the court did not consider this request. India will phase out all endosulfan use by 2017. On January 10, 2017, The Supreme Court ordered the State Governments to release the remaining undisbursed payment of compensation quantified (Rupees Five lakhs each) to all the affected persons within three months.

KM Sreekumar and Prathapan KD (2013) of Kerala Agricultural University critically examined the epidemiological studies on health conducted by the Calicut Medical College. Research design, health parameters, pesticide residue analysis, inconsistencies in the results, and conclusions of the study were questioned with data. A study by Embrandiri et al was also examined. The action of the CMC researchers in bringing out two different reports -one 15 paged and the other 55 paged on the same subject and opportunistic use of scientific claims against research ethics were exposed. The adverse impact of the baseless propaganda of health effects caused by endosulfan on the life of the people of Kasaragod was narrated.

Sreekumar and Prathapan (2021) reviewed the literature on the toxicology of endosulfan including assessment of the various pesticide-regulating agencies worldwide, and found that doses of endosulfan recommended for agricultural purposes did not cause any public health issue anywhere in the world. The statistical analysis of the medical camp data and primary data of the 2015 Kerala Disability Census, does not indicate a higher prevalence any of the health problems in the endosulfan-sprayed areas adjoining Plantation Corporation of Kerala owned cashew estates, compared to the unsprayed areas in the same Grama Panchayath in Kasaragod and elsewhere in Kerala.

=== New Zealand ===
Endosulfan was banned in New Zealand by the Environmental Risk Management Authority effective January 2009 after a concerted campaign by environmental groups and the Green Party.

=== Philippines ===
A shipment of about 10 tonnes of endosulfan was illegally stowed on the ill-fated MV Princess of the Stars, a ferry that sank off the waters of Romblon (Sibuyan Island), Philippines, during a storm in June 2008. Search, rescue, and salvage efforts were suspended when the endosulfan shipment was discovered, and blood samples from divers at the scene were sent to Malaysia for analysis. The Department of Health of the Philippines has temporarily banned the consumption of fish caught in the area. Endosulfan is classified as a "Severe Marine Pollutant" by the International Maritime Dangerous Goods Code.

=== United States ===
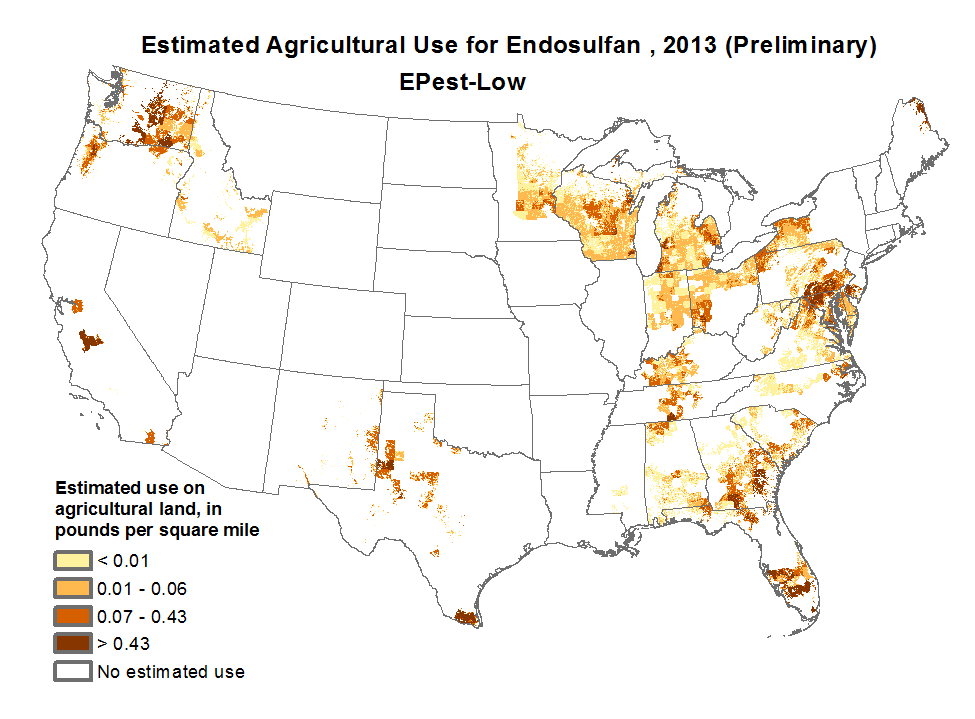
Endosulfan use in the US in pounds per square mile by county in 2013

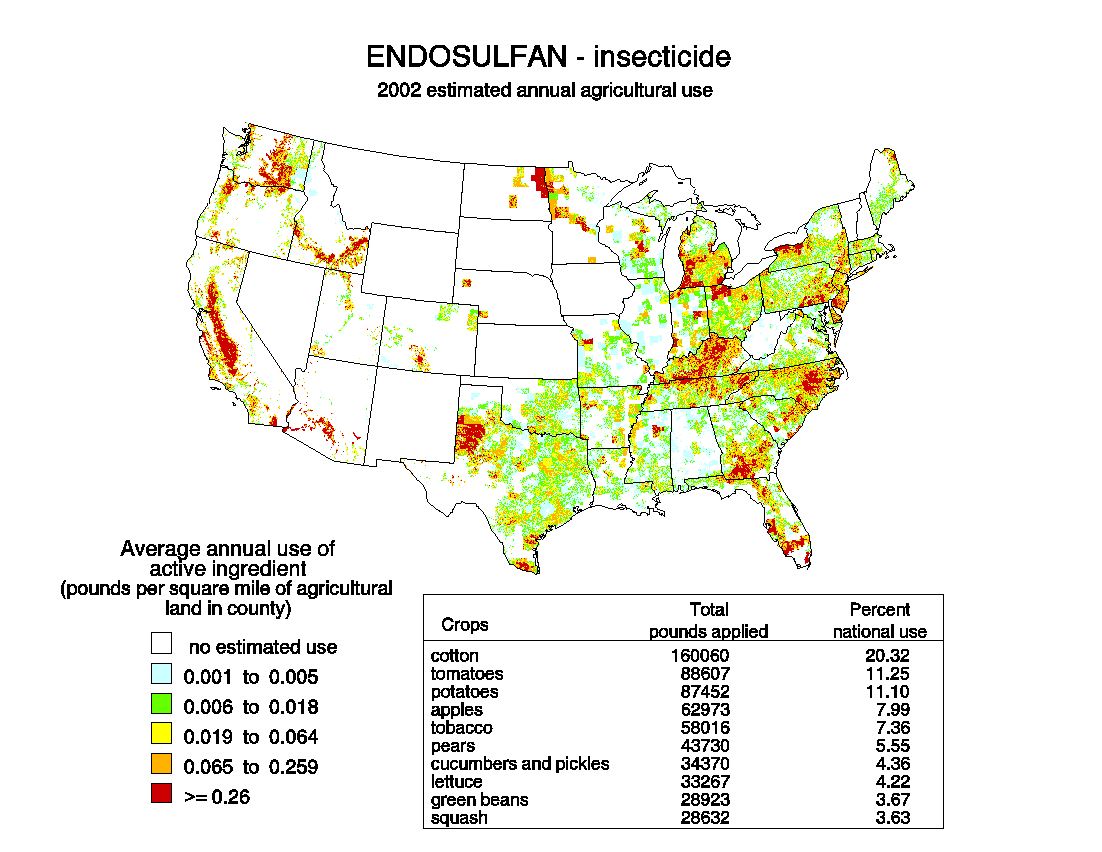
Endosulfan use in the US in pounds per square mile by county in 2002

In the United States, endosulfan is only registered for agricultural use, and these uses are being phased out. It has been used extensively on cotton, potatoes, tomatoes, and apples according to the EPA. The EPA estimates that 626 thousand kg of endosulfan were used annually from 1987 to 1997. The US exported more than 140,000 lb of endosulfan from 2001 to 2003, mostly to Latin America, but production and export has since stopped.

In California, endosulfan contamination from the San Joaquin Valley has been implicated in the extirpation of the mountain yellow-legged frog from parts of the nearby Sierra Nevada. In Florida, levels of contamination the Everglades and Biscayne Bay are high enough to pose a threat to some aquatic organisms.

In 2007, the EPA announced it was rereviewing the safety of endosulfan. The following year, Pesticide Action Network and NRDC petitioned the EPA to ban endosulfan, and a coalition of environmental and labor groups sued the EPA seeking to overturn its 2002 decision to not ban endosulfan. In June 2010, the EPA announced it was negotiating a phaseout of all uses with the sole US manufacturer, Makhteshim Agan, and a complete ban on the compound.

An official statement by Makhteshim Agan of North America (MANA) states, "From a scientific standpoint, MANA continues to disagree fundamentally with EPA's conclusions regarding endosulfan and believes that key uses are still eligible for re-registration." The statement adds, "However, given the fact that the endosulfan market is quite small and the cost of developing and submitting additional data high, we have decided to voluntarily negotiate an agreement with EPA that provides growers with an adequate time frame to find alternatives for the damaging insect pests currently controlled by endosulfan."

=== Australia ===
Australia banned endosulfan on October 12, 2010, with a two-year phase-out for stock of endosulfan-containing products. Australia had, in 2008, announced endosulfan would not be banned. Citing New Zealand's ban, the Australian Greens called for "zero tolerance" of endosulfan residue on food.

=== Taiwan ===
US apples with endosulfan are now allowed to be exported to Taiwan, although the ROC government denied any US pressure on it.

=== Brazil ===
Brazil decreed total ban of the substance from July 31, 2013, being forbidden imports of the product from July 31, 2011, date in which national production and utilization begins to be phased out gradually.
