= Toxicity class =

Pesticide classification system

Indian toxicity label system

Toxicity symbol for European toxicity class I and class II

Toxicity class refers to a classification system for pesticides that has been created by a national or international government-related or -sponsored organization. It addresses the acute toxicity of agents such as soil fumigants, fungicides, herbicides, insecticides, miticides, molluscicides, nematicides, or rodenticides.

== General considerations ==
Assignment to a toxicity class is based typically on results of acute toxicity studies such as the determination of LD_{50} values in animal experiments, notably rodents, via oral, inhaled, or external application. The experimental design measures the acute death rate of an agent. The toxicity class generally does not address issues of other potential harm of the agent, such as bioaccumulation, issues of carcinogenicity, teratogenicity, mutagenic effects, or the impact on reproduction.

Regulating agencies may require that packaging of the agent be labeled with a signal word, a specific warning label to indicate the level of toxicity.

== By jurisdiction ==
=== World Health Organization ===
The World Health Organization (WHO) names four toxicity classes:

- Class I – a: extremely hazardous
- Class I – b: highly hazardous
- Class II: moderately hazardous
- Class III: slightly hazardous

The system is based on LD50 determination in rats, thus an oral solid agent with an LD50 at 5 mg or less/kg bodyweight is Class Ia, at 5–50 mg/kg is Class Ib, LD50 at 50–2000 mg/kg is Class II, and at LD50 at the concentration more than 2000 mg/kg is classified as Class III. Values may differ for liquid oral agents and dermal agents.

=== European Union ===
There are eight toxicity classes in the European Union's classification system, which is regulated by Directive 67/548/EEC:

- Class I: very toxic
- Class II: toxic
- Class III: harmful
- Class IV : corrosive
- Class V : irritant
- Class VI : sensitizing
- Class VII : carcinogenic
- Class VIII : mutagenic

Very toxic and toxic substances are marked by the European toxicity symbol.

=== India ===
The Indian standardized system of toxicity labels for pesticides uses a 4-color system (red, yellow, blue, green) to plainly label containers with the toxicity class of the contents.

=== United States ===
The United States Environmental Protection Agency (EPA) uses four toxicity classes in its toxicity category rating. Classes I to III are required to carry a signal word on the label. Pesticides are regulated in the United States primarily by the Federal Insecticide, Fungicide, and Rodenticide Act (FIFRA).

==== Toxicity class I ====
- most toxic;
- requires signal word: "Danger-Poison", with skull and crossbones symbol, possibly followed by:

"Fatal if swallowed", "Poisonous if inhaled", "Extremely hazardous by skin contact--rapidly absorbed through skin", or "Corrosive--causes eye damage and severe skin burns" Danger-Poison

Class I materials are estimated to be fatal to an adult human at a dose of less than 5 grams (less than a teaspoon).

==== Toxicity class II ====
- moderately toxic
- signal word: "Warning", possibly followed by:

"Harmful or fatal if swallowed", "Harmful or fatal if absorbed through the skin", "Harmful or fatal if inhaled", or "Causes skin and eye irritation"

Class II materials are estimated to be fatal to an adult human at a dose of 5 to 30 grams.

==== Toxicity class III ====
- slightly toxic
- Signal word: Caution, possibly followed by:

"Harmful if swallowed", "May be harmful if absorbed through the skin", "May be harmful if inhaled", or "May irritate eyes, nose, throat, and skin"

Class III materials are estimated to be fatal to an adult human at some dose in excess of 30 grams.

==== Toxicity class IV ====
- practically nontoxic
- no signal word required since 2002

==== General versus restricted use ====
Furthermore, the EPA classifies pesticides into those anybody can apply (general use pesticides), and those that must be applied by or under the supervision of a certified individual. Application of restricted use pesticides requires that a record of the application be kept.

== See also ==
- Dangerous goods
- Hazard symbol
- Globally Harmonized System
- Toxicity label
