= Restricted use pesticide =

Chemicals only for special use in US

Restricted use pesticides (RUP) are pesticides not available to the general public in the United States. Fulfilling its pesticide regulation responsibilities, the United States Environmental Protection Agency (EPA) registers all pesticides as either "unclassified" or "restricted use". Unclassified pesticides are available over-the-counter, while the latter require a license to purchase and apply the product. Pesticides are classified as "restricted use" for a variety of reasons, such as potential for or history of groundwater contamination.

The RUP classification restricts a product, or its uses, to use by a certificated pesticide applicator or under the direct supervision of a certified applicator. Certification programs are administered by the federal government, individual states, and by company policies that vary from state to state. This is managed by the EPA under the Worker Protection Standard, in cooperation with the United States Department of Agriculture.

The RUP list is part of Title 40 of the Code of Federal Regulations (40 CFR 152.175). Atrazine is the most widely used restricted-use herbicide, however there are over 700 RUPs as of 2017. Many insecticides and fungicides used in fruit production are restricted use.

== License ==
The Worker Protection Standard (WPS) identifies the type of requirements that must be satisfied to obtain the proper license needed to purchase and apply restricted use pesticide. The process required to obtain a pest control licenses is regulated by a combination of state laws, federal laws, common law, and private company policies. All RUP applications must be recorded to identify the date, location, and type of pesticide applied. Federal law requires a minimum record retention period, which may be three years or longer depending upon state laws. There are two licensee categories: supervisor and applicator. A pest control supervisor license is required to purchase RUP. Duties of a licensed pest control supervisor include:

- ensuring that pest control applicators are competent to use any restricted use products.
- maintaining application records for 3 years or more, as determined by state and federal laws. These records must identify the date, location, and type of pesticide that has been applied.
- notifying the local government agency that is responsible for air quality to satisfy laws governing the right to know regarding public health and safety risks when restricted use pesticides are applied outside buildings.

== See also ==
- Federal Insecticide, Fungicide, and Rodenticide Act (FIFRA)
- Pesticide misuse
- Toxicity class
