= Experimental use permit =

Pesticide permit

An experimental use permit is a permit under the Federal Insecticide, Fungicide, and Rodenticide Act (7 U.S.C. 136c) that authorizes the testing of new pesticides or uses thereof in experimental field studies on 10 acres (40,000 m^{2}) or more of land or 1-acre (4,000 m^{2}) or more of water. Such tests provide data to support registration of pesticides.
