= Worker Protection Standard =

United States Environmental Protection Agency
- Citation: 40 CFR Part 170
- Enacted by: United States Environmental Protection Agency
- Enacted: 1992
- Administered by: United States Environmental Protection Agency

Related legislation
- issued under the authority of FIFRA

The Worker Protection Standard (WPS) is a United States Environmental Protection Agency (EPA) federal regulation (40 CFR Part 170), intended to protect employees on farms, forests, nurseries, and greenhouses that are occupationally exposed to agricultural pesticides. Restricted use pesticides control is managed by the EPA under this regulation. It includes the following requirements:

- Pesticide Safety Training
- Notification of Pesticide Applications to Employees and between Employers
- Application, Safety & Hazard Communication to Employees & Contract Workers
- Recordkeeping Requirements
- Use of Personal Protective Equipment
- Restricted Entry Intervals (REI) following Pesticide Application
- Decontamination Supplies
- Emergency Medical Assistance
- Application Exclusion Zone (enforcement starts January 1, 2018)

Other organizations and programs related in one way or the other to the administering of and reporting about WPS-based pesticide control include:

- AAPCO—Assoc. of American Pesticide Control Officials
- AAPSE—American Assoc. of Pesticide Safety Educators
- CTAG—Certification and Training Assessment Group
- CPARD—Certification Plan & Reporting Database
- POINTS—Pesticide of Interest Reporting Database
- NASDA Pesticide Safety Programs
- Division of Toxicology and Environmental Medicine; Agency for Toxic Substances and Disease Registry
- National Toxicology Program

== See also ==
- Hazard Communication Standard, a regulation requiring all employers to disclose all hazards to employees separately from the WPS.
