= Hazard Communication Standard =

The Hazard Communication Standard (HCS) requires employers to disclose toxic and hazardous substances in workplaces. This is related to the Worker Protection Standard.

Specifically, this requires employee access to Safety Data Sheets (SDS), Globally Harmonized System of Classification and Labeling of Chemicals (GHS) or equivalent, and appropriate training to understand health and safety risks. This requirement is necessary to ensure that the employees/workers understand the hazards of the chemicals they are using as well as the precautions required for safe handling. In addition, the chemical and any mixture's classification are also needed.

The GHS was created to aid in a universal process of classifying and labeling all hazardous substances. The ninth revision is the most current, released in December 2021.

The European Union (EU) began to adopt the GHS into their standards in 2009, having the EU Classification, Labelling and Packaging (CLP) reflect the same as the GHS before putting it into full force. Following was the United States, which finally adopted the GHS in 2012, and it is now known as OSHA's HCS 2012 when referenced for enforcement. Canada adopted the GHS in 2015, changing the federal Hazardous Product Act (HPA) and making a new regulation. The Hazardous Products Regulations (HPR) were created under the HPA to embody the GHS as the new standard.

== History ==
Workplace safety in the USA began long before Dr. Alice Hamilton in Chicago, who began working for the state of Illinois in 1910 to deal with workplace safety.

The Occupational Safety and Health Administration was established in 1970 to standardize safety for nearly all workers in the United States, and hazard communication for toxic substance exposure was included during the 1980s.

The Globally Harmonized System of Classification and Labeling of Chemicals (GHS) is currently being pursued to standardize workplace hazard protection internationally. As GHS has been adopted as the Hazard Communication Standard in the following Countries with the year of adoption.

Countries and years of adoption
Country	Year
Brazil	2010
Canada	2015
China	2011
Ecuador	2018
EU/EEA*	2009
Indonesia	2013
Japan	2012
Korea	2013
Malaysia	2014
Mauritius	2004
New Zealand	2020
Philippines	2014
Singapore	2005
Taiwan	2008
Thailand	2012
Turkey	2015
United States	2012
Uruguay	2009

* The countries covered by the EU/ European Economic Area (EEA): Austria, Belgium, Bulgaria, Croatia, Cyprus, Czech Republic, Denmark, Estonia, Finland, France, Germany, Greece, Hungary, Ireland, Italy, Latvia, Lithuania, Luxembourg, Malta, Poland, Portugal, Romania, Slovakia, Slovenia, Spain, Sweden, Netherlands and the United Kingdom.

OSHA's Hazard Communication Standard (HAZCOM) was first adopted in 1983 in the United States with limited scope (48 FR 53280; November 25, 1983). In 1987, scope was expanded to cover all industries where employees are potentially exposed to hazardous chemicals (52 FR 31852; August 24, 1987). This is managed by the Occupational Safety and Health Administration. This is managed by states that have an approved plan.

The standard is identified in 29 C.F.R. 1910.1200. The summary is as follows.

"This occupational safety and health standard is intended to address comprehensively the issue of classifying the potential hazards of chemicals, and communicating information concerning hazards and appropriate protective measures to employees, and to preempt any legislative or regulatory enactments of a state, or political subdivision of a state, pertaining to this subject. Classifying the potential hazards of chemicals and communicating information concerning hazards and appropriate protective measures to employees, may include, for example, but is not limited to, provisions for: developing and maintaining a written hazard communication program for the workplace, including lists of hazardous chemicals present; labeling of containers of chemicals in the workplace, as well as of containers of chemicals being shipped to other workplaces; preparation and distribution of safety data sheets to employees and downstream employers; and development and implementation of employee training programs regarding hazards of chemicals and protective measures. Under section 18 of the Act, no state or political subdivision of a state may adopt or enforce any requirement relating to the issue addressed by this Federal standard, except pursuant to a Federally-approved state plan."

The United States Department of Defense does not manage hazards in accordance with public law.

- DoD and the right to know

== Purpose ==
The Purpose is identified in 29 C.F.R. 1910 1200, and is defined as follows:

"The purpose of this section is to ensure that the hazards of all chemicals produced or imported are classified, and that information concerning the classified hazards is transmitted to employers and employees. The requirements of this section are intended to be consistent with the provisions of the United Nations Globally Harmonized System of Classification and Labelling of Chemicals (GHS), Revision 3. The transmittal of information is to be accomplished by means of comprehensive hazard communication programs, which are to include container labeling and other forms of warning, safety data sheets and employee training."

Employees access to hazard information is one of the prerequisites required for access to competent medical diagnosis and treatment.

Environmental illness share characteristics with common diseases. Cyanide exposure symptoms include weakness, headache, nausea, confusion, dizziness, seizures, cardiac arrest, and unconsciousness. Influenza and heart disease include the same symptoms. Failure to obtain proper disclosure is likely to lead to improper or ineffective medical diagnosis and treatment.

The Hazard Communication Standard requires the Safety Data Sheet to be made readily available for workplace exposure in the United States, because this information is required by physicians so they can do their job.

Physicians also require epidemiological data maintained by local government agencies responsible for maintaining pesticide application data for use outside buildings (environmental exposure). This is part of the Right to know.
