= Cloransulam-methyl =

Selective herbicide

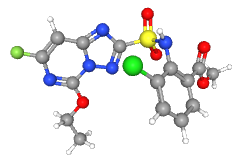
- Model of the molecular structure of cloransulam-methyl

Names
- IUPAC name methyl 3-chloro-2-[(5-ethoxy-7-fluoro-[1,2,4]triazolo[1,5-c]pyrimidin-2-yl)sulfonylamino]benzoate

Identifiers
3D model (JSmol)	Interactive image
ChEBI	CHEBI:3760
ChemSpider	77968
ECHA InfoCard	100.133.358
EC Number	604-573-3
KEGG	C10907
PubChem CID	86453
UNII	N9P737Z6HO
CompTox Dashboard (EPA)	DTXSID8034372
- InChI: InChI=1S/C15H13ClFN5O5S/c1-3-27-15-18-10(17)7-11-19-14(20-22(11)15)28(24,25)21-12-8(13(23)26-2)5-4-6-9(12)16/h4-7,21H,3H2,1-2H3
- SMILES: CCOC1=NC(=CC2=NC(=NN21)S(=O)(=O)NC3=C(C=CC=C3Cl)C(=O)OC)F

Properties
Chemical formula	C_{15}H_{13}ClFN_{5}O_{5}S
Molar mass	429.81 g·mol^{−1}
Appearance	Off-white solid with a slight odor of mint
Density	1.538 g/cm^{3} at 20 °C
Melting point	216–218 °C (421–424 °F; 489–491 K)
Solubility in water	In water, 3 ppm (pH 5), 184 ppm (pH 7) at 25 °C
Vapor pressure	3.0 × 10^{−16} mm Hg (4.0 × 10^{−11} mPa) at 25 °C
- Except where otherwise noted, data are given for materials in their standard state (at 25 °C [77 °F], 100 kPa). Infobox references

Cloransulam-methyl is an herbicide that is used for the control of weeds among soya beans and other crops. It is part of the chemical family of triazolopyrimidine sulfonanilides.

== Characteristics ==
Cloransulam-methyl is non-volatile chemical with moderate solubility in water. The chemical quickly decays via photolysis when in water. In its natural state, it appears as an off white powder with a faint mint smell.

Cloransulam-methyl's HRAC classification is Group B (global, Aus), Group 2 (numeric), as it is an acetohydroxyacid synthase inhibitor.

== Uses ==
Cloransulam-methyl can be applied to the surface of the soil near soybean plants to control the growth of broadleaf weeds. The chemical works by inhibiting amino acid synthesis in the plants.
