= Federal Insecticide, Fungicide, and Rodenticide Act =

US federal law governing pesticide regulation

- Long title: An Act to regulate the marketing of economic poisons and devices, and for other purposes
- Acronyms (colloquial): FIFRA
- Enacted by: the 80th United States Congress
- Effective: June 25, 1947

Citations
- Public law: Pub. L. 80–104
- Statutes at Large: 61 Stat. 163

Codification
- Titles amended: 7 U.S.C.: Agriculture
- U.S.C. sections created: 7 U.S.C. ch. 6 § 136 et seq.

Legislative history
- Signed into law by President Harry S. Truman on June 25, 1947

Major amendments
- Federal Environmental Pesticide Control Act (1972); Food Quality Protection Act

United States Supreme Court cases
- Monsanto v. Durnell

The Federal Insecticide, Fungicide, and Rodenticide Act (FIFRA) is a United States federal law that set up the basic U.S. system of pesticide regulation to protect applicators, consumers, and the environment. It is administered and regulated by the United States Environmental Protection Agency (EPA) and the appropriate environmental agencies of the respective states. FIFRA has undergone several important amendments since its inception. A significant revision in 1972 by the Federal Environmental Pesticide Control Act (FEPCA) and several others have expanded EPA's present authority to oversee the sales and use of pesticides with emphasis on the preservation of human health and protection of the environment by "(1) strengthening the registration process by shifting the burden of proof to the chemical manufacturer, (2) enforcing compliance against banned and unregistered products, and (3) promulgating the regulatory framework missing from the original law".

== History ==
Mexican Brand Insect Fluid, "Under the Insecticide Act of 1910"

The Federal Insecticide Act (FIA) of 1910 was the first pesticide legislation enacted. This legislation ensured quality pesticides by protecting farmers and consumers from fraudulent and/or adulterated products by manufacturers and distributors. During World War II there was a marked increase in the pesticide market, as wartime research and development produced many chemicals with newly discovered insecticidal properties. Widespread usage of pesticides garnered much public and political support due to the resulting post war food surplus made possible by higher crop yield from significantly lower pest damage. Synthetic organic insecticide usage increased from 100 million pounds in 1945 to over 300 million pounds by 1950. The Federal Insecticide Act of 1910 set standards for chemical quality and provided consumers protection but did not address the growing issue of potential environmental damage and biological health risks associated with such widespread use of insecticides. Congress passed the Federal Insecticide, Fungicide, and Rodenticide Act in 1947 to address some of the shortcomings of the Federal Insecticide Act.

Congress enacted major revisions to FIFRA in 1972 with the Federal Environmental Pesticide Control Act (FEPCA). The 1947 law assigned the United States Department of Agriculture responsibility for regulating pesticides. The 1972 amendment transferred this responsibility to the Environmental Protection Agency and shifted emphasis to protection of the environment and public health. The amendments required the EPA to assess potential risks the pesticides posed to humans, the environment, and wildlife and weigh these against their benefits, taking action against those for which the risks outweighed the benefits. In 1988, Congress amended the pesticide registration provisions requiring re-registration of many pesticides that had been registered before 1984. The act was amended again in 1996 by the Food Quality Protection Act. More recently the act was amended in 2012 by the Pesticide Registration Improvement Extension Act of 2012.

As of May 2007, there are 28 listed restricted pesticides of different formulas and mixtures. Any area these pesticides are used or applied is considered a restricted area.

== Major code sections ==
Table 2. Major U.S. Code Sections of the Federal Insecticide, Fungicide, and Rodenticide Act (codified generally as 7 U.S.C. 136-136y)

7 U.S.C.	Section Title	FIFRA
	Short title and table of contents	Section 1
136	Definitions	Section 2
136a	Registration of pesticides	Section 3
136a-1	Reregistration of registered pesticides	Section 4
136c	Experimental use permits	Section 5
136d	Administration review; suspension	Section 6
136e	Registration of establishments	Section 7
136f	Books and records	Section 8
136g	Inspection of establishments	Section 9
136h	Protection of trade secrets and other information	Section 10
136i	Restricted use pesticides; applicators	Section 11
136j	Unlawful acts	Section 12
136k	Stop sale, use, removal, and seizure	Section 13
136l	Penalties	Section 14
136m	Indemnities	Section 15
136n	Administrative procedure; judicial review	Section 16
136o	Exemption of federal and state agencies	Section 17
136p	Exemption of federal and state agencies	Section 18
136q	Storage, disposal, transportation, and recall	Section 19
136r	Research and monitoring	Section 20
136s	Solicitation of comments; notice of public hearings	Section 21
136t	Delegation and cooperation	Section 22
136u	State cooperation, aid, and training	Section 23
136v	Authority of states	Section 24
136w	Authority of Administrator	Section 25
136w-1	State primary enforcement responsibility	Section 26
136w-2	Failure by the state to assure enforcement of state pesticides use regulations	Section 27
136w-3	Identification of pests; cooperation with Department of Agriculture's program	Section 28
136w-4	Annual report	Section 29
136w-5	Minimum requirements for training of maintenance applicators and service technicians	Section 30
136w-6	Environmental Protection Agency minor use program	Section 31
136w-7	Department of Agriculture minor use program	Section 32
136w-8	Pesticide Registration Service Fees	Section 33
136x	Severability	Section 34
136y	Authorization of Appropriations	Section 35

Note: This table shows only the major code sections. For more detail and to determine when a section was added, the reader should consult the official printed version of the U.S. Code.

== Regulations ==
In order to be considered for use, pesticides had to undergo 120 tests with regards to safety and its actual effectiveness. Because of these rigorous test, only 1 in 139,000 actually make it through to be used in agriculture. This act directly forbids certain substances and certain uses of those substances, as distinguished from other legislation regulating pesticides, which impose costs on certain practices but do not outlaw any.

FIFRA established a set of pesticide regulations:

1. FIFRA established registration for all pesticides, which is only done after a period of data collection to determine the effectiveness for its intended use, appropriate dosage, and hazards of the particular material. When registered, a label is created to instruct the final user the proper usage of the material. If instructions are ignored, users are liable for any negative consequences.
  Label directions are designed to maximize the effectiveness of the product, while protecting the applicator, consumers, and the environment.
2. Only a few pesticides are made available to the general public. Most pesticides are considered too hazardous for general use, and are restricted to certified applicators. FIFRA established a system of examination and certification both at the private level and at the commercial level for applicators who wish to purchase and use restricted use pesticides. The distribution of restricted pesticides is also monitored.
3. The EPA has different review processes for three categories of pesticides: antimicrobials, biopesticides, and conventional pesticides. The three categories have a similar application process, but have different data requirements and review policies. Depending on the category of pesticide, the review process can take several years. After a pesticide is registered with the EPA, there may be state registration requirements to consider.
4. In addition to the rules and regulations given by the EPA, the states may also offer an additional set of rules and registration requirements for a registered pesticide. They can also request annual usage reports from the pesticide users.

In addition to the FIFRA, the Pesticide Registration Improvement Act of 2003 amended the authorized fees for certain products, assessed the process of collecting maintenance fees, and decided on a review process for approving the pesticides. The Pesticide Registration Improvement Act of 2007 renewed these changes to stay in place until 2012. The purpose of the PRIA is to ensure a smooth implementation of pesticide rules and regulations to its users.

=== Import and export ===
Pesticides intended for import into the U.S. require a complete Notice of Arrival (NOA) through U.S. Customs and Border Protection. If this NOA is not complete the product would not make it through customs. The NOA lists the identity of the product, the amount within the package, the date of arrival, and where it can be inspected. There are also other rules listed below:

1. It must comply with standards set with the U.S. pesticide law
2. The pesticide has to be registered with the EPA, except if it's on the exemption list
3. It cannot be adulterated or violative
4. There must be proper labeling
5. The product must have been produced in an EPA registered establishment that files annually

Pesticides intended for export to other parts of the world do not have a registration requirement under certain conditions. The conditions are as follows:

1. The foreign purchaser has to submit a statement to the EPA stating it knows the product is not registered and can't be sold on U.S. soil.
2. The pesticide must contain a label that "Not Registered for Use in the United States"
3. The label requirements must be met and the label must contain the English language and the language of the receiving country(ies).
4. The pesticide must comply with all FIFRA establishment registration and reporting requirements
5. It must comply with FIFRA record keeping requirements
- Note: An EPA registered establishment is one that produces pesticides, the active ingredients in pesticides, and devices for pesticide use and reports initial and annual production.

On April 22, 2016, the Office of Inspector General issued a memorandum announcing its intent to begin preliminary research to assess the EPA's inspections of, and enforcement against, illegal pesticide imports. The objective of this project is to "determine whether the EPA's Federal Insecticide, Fungicide, and Rodenticide Act (FIFRA) import inspection program is effectively deterring, identifying and confiscating illegal pesticide imports, to protect human health and the environment."

== Registration of pesticide products ==
Before a company can register its pesticide products with the EPA, it must know what the EPA considers a pesticide under the law. According to section 2(u) of FIFRA, 7 U.S.C. section 136(u), the term "pesticide" is defined as the following:

1. any substance or mixture of substances intended for preventing, destroying, repelling, or mitigating any pest,
2. any substance or mixture of substances intended for use as a plant regulator, defoliant, or desiccant, and
3. any nitrogen stabilizer, except that the term "pesticide" shall not include any article that is a "new animal drug" within the meaning of section 321(w)[1] of title 21, that has been determined by the Secretary of Health and Human Services not to be a new animal drug by a regulation establishing conditions of use for the article, or that is an animal feed within the meaning of section 321(x)[1] of title 21 bearing or containing a new animal drug. The term "pesticide" does not include liquid chemical sterilant products (including any sterilant or subordinate disinfectant claims on such products) for use on a critical or semi-critical device, as defined in section 321 of title 21. For purposes of the preceding sentence, the term "critical device" includes any device which is introduced directly into the human body, either into or in contact with the bloodstream or normally sterile areas of the body and the term "semi-critical device" includes any device which contacts intact mucous membranes but which does not ordinarily penetrate the blood barrier or otherwise enter normally sterile areas of the body.

An applicant will have to prove that the pesticide active ingredient, pesticide product, or proposed new use of a registered pesticide will not cause unreasonable adverse effects on human health and environment. An unreasonable adverse effect is "(1) any risk that is unreasonable to man or the environment that takes social, economic, and environmental costs as well as benefits into consideration and (2) any dietary risk that could be the result of a pesticide used with any food lacking consistency with the standards listed under Section 408 of the Federal Food, Drug, and Cosmetic Act"(FDCA). The applicant must provide scientific data from any combinations of over 100 different tests conducted under EPA guidelines to assess these potential adverse short-term and long-term effects. There is considerable public interest in the contents of pesticide registration studies, which has led to conflict over public access to these materials. These competing interests as well as legislation addressing access has been covered separately under Pesticide regulation in the United States. In some cases, manufacturers choose to conduct addition work to satisfy requirements for peer-reviewed literature, as was the case for the herbicide, cloransulam-methyl. Publication of registration studies in the peer-reviewed literature not only provides unlimited public access, but also ensures sufficient rigor to satisfy the scientific community at large.

Under Section 408 of the Federal Food, Drug, and Cosmetic Act (FFDCA), the EPA can also regulate the amount of pesticide residues permissible on or in food/feed items, by establishing a "safe" level meaning there is "a reasonable certainty of no harm" from the exposure to the residue whether directly from the consumption of such food or from other non-occupational sources. For food crops, the EPA is required to establish a "tolerance" level, the maximum "safe" level of pesticide present on or in the particular food/feed commodity. The EPA may also choose to provide an exemption to the requirement of an established tolerance level, allowing any amount of a pesticide residue to remain on or in food or feed as long as the exemption meets FFDCA safety standards. Successfully registered pesticides must conform to approved uses and conditions of use, which the registrant must state on the label.

=== Reregistration of pesticides ===
A majority of older registered were required to be reregistered under guidelines set by Amendments in 1972, 1988, and 1996 (Table1) in order to meet current health and safety standards, labeling requirements, and for risk regulation and moderation. The Food Quality Protection Act (FQPA), amended FIFRA to require all older pesticides to cause no harm to infants, children, and sensitive individuals within "reasonable certainty". Through the reregistration program, older pesticides are eligible for reregistration if they have a complete database and not cause unreasonable health and environmental risks if used as directed in accordance to their labels. FQPA also requires the EPA to review pesticides on a 15-year cycle to ensure all pesticides meet contemporary safety and regulatory standards.

=== Fees ===
Initial and final fees for reregistration of food or feed use active ingredients are $50,000 and $100,000-$150,000, respectively. Reregistration fees for non-food use pesticides are $50,000-$100,000. Annual maintenance fees are also imposed: $425 per product up to fifty products and a maximum of $20,000 per company. For each product over fifty, the fee is $100, for a maximum fee of $35,000. Fees may be reduced or waived for small business registrants, public health pesticides, or minor use pesticides at the EPA's discretion, and failure to pay reregistration fees or maintenance fees may result in cancellation of a product registration.

== Regulated non-pesticidal products not requiring registration ==
Adjuvants are chemicals added to enhance the performance or efficacy and/or alter the physical properties of the pesticidal agents. More than 200 EPA registered pesticides recommends specific addition of one or more adjuvants into the pesticidal mixture to improve overall efficacy. Recognized as "other ingredients", the EPA also establishes tolerance levels for adjuvants, but they are not required to be registered. Examples of adjuvants include:

1. acidifying agents,
2. buffering agents,
3. anti-foam agents,
4. defoaming agents,
5. anti-transpirants,
6. dyes and brighteners,
7. compatibility agents,
8. crop oil concentrates,
9. oil surfactants,
10. deposition agents,
11. drift reduction agents,
12. foam markers,
13. feeding stimulants,
14. herbicide safeners,
15. spreaders, extenders,
16. adhesive agents,
17. suspension agents,
18. gelling agents,
19. synergists,
20. wetting agents,
21. emulsifiers,
22. dispersing agents,
23. penetrants,
24. tank and equipment cleaners,
25. neutralizers,
26. water absorbents, and
27. water softeners.

Devices and instruments used to trap or kill pests or plant life, but not including equipment used to apply pesticides when sold separately, are also regulated but not required to be registered. Pesticide "intermediates" used in the synthesis or manufacture of the pesticide products may be regulated but are also not required to be registered with FIFRA. However, these pesticide intermediates may be regulated by the Toxic Substances Control Act of 1976.

== Enforcement ==
Under FIFRA no individual may sell, use, nor distribute a pesticide not registered with the United States Environmental Protection Agency (EPA). A few exceptions allow a pesticide to be exempt from registration requirements. There must be a label on each pesticide describing, in detail, instructions for safe use. Under the act, the EPA must identify each pesticide as "general use", "restricted use", or both. "General use" labeled pesticides are available to anyone in the general public. Those labeled as "restricted use" require specific credentials and certifications through the EPA (certified applicator).

Although FIFRA is generally enforced by the EPA, Sections 23, 24, 26 and 27 extend primary enforcement authorities to the states. However, EPA authority always supersedes state authority, and primary state authority can be rescinded if the state fails to assure safe enforcement of pesticides usage. Section 9 authorizes inspection of pesticides in storage for sale or distribution. Under Section 13, EPA may issue a Stop Sale, Use or Removal Order (SSURO) to prevent the sale or distribution of violative pesticides and for the authority to seize these pesticides. Section 15 provides indemnity payments for suspended or cancelled registrations. Section 16 allows for a judicial review process for individuals or entities affected by an EPA order or action.

Section 14 establishes civil and federal penalties for violative acts. Some examples of these unlawful acts include:

1. Distributing, selling, or delivering any unregistered pesticide.
2. Making any advertising claim about a pesticide not included in the registration statement.
3. Selling any registered pesticide if its content does not conform to label data.
4. Falsification of any test-related information or the submission of any false data to support registration.
5. Selling an adulterated or misbranded pesticide.
6. Detaching, altering, defacing, or destroying any part of a container or label.
7. Refusing to keep records or permit authorized EPA inspections.
8. Making a guarantee other than that specified by the label.
9. Advertising a restricted-use pesticide without giving the product classification.
10. Making a restricted-use pesticide available to a non-certified applicator (except as provided by law).
11. Using a pesticide in any manner not consistent with the label.

=== Civil penalties ===
When determining civil penalties, the EPA would take into consideration the severity of infraction, effects of penalties, and size of business. Under Section 14 (a)(1), commercial applicators, wholesalers, dealers, and retailers "may be assessed a civil penalty…of not more than $5,000 for each offense". Private applicators would be given a warning for the first offense, and a fine up to $1000 may be assessed for each subsequent violation.

=== Federal/criminal penalties ===
Violative acts are charged as misdemeanors and subject to fines and/or imprisonment. A private applicator is subject to $1000 and/or 30 days imprisonment. A commercial applicator is subject to $25,000 and/or up to one year imprisonment. A manufacturer or producer is subject to $50,000 and/or up to one year imprisonment.

== Special review ==
FIFRA requires the EPA to continually monitor and update registered pesticides for any new information concerning their safety. Registrants are required to promptly report any new evidence of adverse side effects and to continually conduct studies to aid in risk assessments. If new information indicates adverse side effects, then EPA may conduct a special review to assess the risks and benefit of continued use of the suspect pesticide. With the completion of a special review, EPA may choose to amend or cancel the registration.

== Pesticides and endangered species ==
The Endangered Species Act protects and promotes animal and plant recovery of ones in danger of extinction due to human activity. Under this act the EPA must also consider the dangers to animals and plants when registering a new pesticide. The pesticide must not harm the listed endangered and threatened animals and habitats. To be sure this program is implemented, some labels will direct users of the pesticides to bulletins with specific information regarding use. The protection program has 2 main goals: (1) provide the best protection of endangered species from pesticides and (2) minimize the impact of the program on pesticide users.

To protect the endangered species with the EPA program, the following was implemented:

1. sound science is used to assess risk to the listed species
2. there is an attempt at finding means to avoid concerns of listed species
3. When concerns of the listed species aren't avoidable, they consult with the Fish and Wildlife Services scientist
4. Implement usage limitations when the Fish and Wildlife service express a potential adverse effect on a particular species based on a biological opinion

In order to implement the usage limitations mentioned above, the EPA will:

1. add a generic label to the pesticide
2. develop bulletins containing habitat location and pesticide use limitations
3. distributing the bulletins containing this information to pesticide users
4. providing a toll-free number for users to contact regarding information in bulletins and how to obtain one.

== Case law ==
FIFRA was central to the United States Supreme Court case, Monsanto Co. v. Durnell (2026). The case centered on consumer-grade versions of Roundup herbicide produced by Monsanto, which had previously used glyphosates. The EPA had yet to find that glyphosates were carcinogenic, but a 2015 study from the International Agency for Research on Cancer in 2015 determined there was a possible connection. Nearly 100,000 lawsuits were brought against Monsanto over the failure to warn of this connection on the product's labels, and several states passed laws and regulations to require Monsanto to label Roundup as a possible carcinogen. Monsanto defended its position in court that FIFRA requires universal labelled set by the EPA that states cannot override. Multiple cases led to a circuit split on this interpretation. The Supreme Court, on a 7-2 decision in June 2026, agreed with Monsanto's position on FIFRA, overturning a jury award and expected to end most of the other ongoing lawsuits, though Monsanto will continue to complete a previously agreed-to $10 billion settlement fund for other suits.

== See also ==
- Agriculture ministry
- Endangered Species Act
- Paris Green
- Pesticide
- Pesticide misuse
- Restricted pesticides
