= Starzl =

Starzl is a German surname. Notable people with the surname include:

- Roman Frederick Starzl (1899–1976), American writer
- Thomas Starzl (1926–2017), American physician and expert on organ transplants
