= Zax (Duke Power) =

Mascot of the North Carolina power company

Zax, as illustrated in 1984.

Zax is an animated mascot character featured in 1980s public service announcements for Charlotte, North Carolina electric power company Duke Power. The character, introduced in 1984, was designed to appeal to children, and educate them about the dangers of electricity, and how to use energy more efficiently. Zax's voice was provided by Charlotte weatherman Larry Sprinkle.

The character appeared in animated public service announcements on television, in a Sunday newspaper comic strip, and in live appearances by a costumed actor at libraries and elementary schools.

== History ==
In 1984, Duke Power released a series of public service announcements to educate children on how to be safe and use electricity efficiently. These cartoon PSAs featured a small, eager to learn computer generated program named Zax, and a group of children who tried to keep him from getting injured or killed by electricity.

Zax appeared in a number of cartoon PSAs throughout the 1980s. In the first 60-second spot, a young boy, Billy, creates Zax on his computer. When Billy goes out to play with his friends, he says that he wishes Zax could come outside and play with them. Zax leaps from the computer screen to join the children, and immediately decides to climb a transmission tower. The children explain that he's not being safe — kids should never try to climb electric poles or towers, or fly kites and planes close to power lines. Zax thanks them, and admits, "Zax has much to learn. Will you teach me?" Billy replies, "This could be the beginning of a beautiful friendship," as the group walks into the sunset.

Other spots feature the children stopping Zax from taking a bath with electric devices nearby, going near downed power lines after a storm and other "misadventures". The PSAs concluded with the line, "This message brought to you by your friends at Duke Power."

Duke Power also produced Zax teaching kits for classroom use, including posters, light switch faceplates, a film-strip and an audio cassette that featured Zax and his friends. In later years, Zax was used for Electric Safety poster contests. Zax was also used for local Earth Day events, along with fellow safety mascots Smokey Bear and Woodsy the Owl. As late as 1997, Duke Power was still distributing Zax coloring books and showing a film called "Zax's Electric Safety Team" at North Carolina 4-H club meetings. They also produced a highly limited number of stuffed Zax toys in 1986.

Duke's "World of Energy" exhibition hall at the Oconee Nuclear Station in Seneca, South Carolina, includes a display with a life-sized sculpture of Zax.

== See also ==
- Mr. Ouch
- Mr. Yuk
- Reddy Kilowatt
