= Jack Paradise =

American pediatrician (1925–2021)

Jack Leon Paradise (1925 – December 20, 2021) was a pediatrician, pediatric primary care researcher, and professor emeritus of pediatrics at University of Pittsburgh School of Medicine.

== Research ==
Paradise asserts that the common fear of developmental problems caused by persistent ear infections in children are unfounded. According to Paradise's research, for children up to 3 years old, "ear disease does not cause any developmental problems." The research asserts that if the insertion of tympanostomy tubes into a child's ear is delayed, there is "no effect on a child's performance on language tests and speech tests."

In otherwise healthy children ages 9 to 11 who have persistent middle-ear effusion, a study led by Paradise concluded that "prompt insertion of tympanostomy tubes does not improve developmental outcomes."

== Impact on medical community ==
According to the UPMC Children's Hospital of Pittsburgh, Paradise's studies have helped to promote the use of strict criteria for tonsillectomy and adenoidectomy. The 78% decline in pediatric tonsillectomies in the United States between 1971 and 1996 has also been largely attributed to his work.
