= Stormie Jones =

American organ transplant recipient

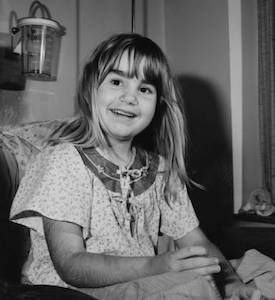
- Stormie Jones, the world’s first heart-liver transplant recipient, initially was treated at UT Southwestern.
- Born: Stormie Dawn Jones; May 30, 1977; Borger, Texas, U.S.
- Died: November 11, 1990 (aged 13); Pittsburgh, Pennsylvania, U.S.
- Resting place: Fort Worth, Texas, U.S.

Stormie Dawn Jones (May 30, 1977 – November 11, 1990) was the world's first recipient of a successful simultaneous heart and liver organ transplant.

== Early life ==
Stormie Dawn Jones was born in Borger, Texas to Susie Jones, a waitress, and an oil field worker. She had an older sister named Misty. Her parents separated when she was five years old.

== Medical Issues ==
When Stormie reached three months of age, discolored bumps began to appear on her skin. A multitude of doctors were unable to find the cause. During this time, the bumps began getting more painful. In the summer of 1983, her mother took her to a specialist who took a biopsy of the bumps and found them to contain nearly pure cholesterol. The specialist then referred Stormie to David Bilheimer, a cholesterol specialist at the University of Texas Health Science Center.

== Diagnosis ==
Bilheimer determined that Stormie suffered from a genetic condition known as homozygous familial hypercholesterolemia, which raised her cholesterol levels to more than seven times that of a normal six-year-old. After being put on a low-cholesterol diet, Stormie suffered a heart attack and underwent double bypass heart surgery that October. She suffered a second heart attack almost two months later, requiring a second bypass operation and an artificial mitral valve. Susie Jones was also told that her daughter had less than a year to live.

Based on research conducted by two Dallas physicians in the late 70s that linked cholesterol production to the liver, Bilheimer suggested a liver transplant for Stormie. This was to be performed at Pittsburgh's Children's Hospital (now UPMC Children's Hospital of Pittsburgh).

There were very specific reasons for performing a combined heart and liver transplant in this young girl. Due to her inherited condition, Stormie's liver was unable to remove cholesterol, i.e. LDL-cholesterol, from her bloodstream. As a result, her LDL-cholesterol levels became very high and caused her to have two heart attacks by age six. On the other hand, the transplanted liver, being normal and healthy, was able to clear the LDL-cholesterol from her blood. Indeed, after the transplant, Stormie's LDL-cholesterol declined by 81%—from an astounding 988 to a near-normal 184 mg per deciliter.

Dr. Thomas E. Starzl, recognizing the previous damage already done to Stormie's heart, did not believe a liver transplant alone could save her. Since she was going to require lifelong immunosuppressant therapy anyway to prevent rejection of her transplanted liver and since her heart had been severely damaged by her previous heart attacks, it was decided to also perform a heart transplant.

== Transplant ==
On February 14, 1984, under the direction of Dr. Starzl, Drs. Byers W. Shaw Jr. and Henry T. Bahnson replaced the six-year-old's heart and liver at the Children's Hospital of Pittsburgh in Pittsburgh, Pennsylvania. The case was part of the research on cholesterol and the liver that won Joseph L. Goldstein and Michael S. Brown the Nobel prize in medicine in 1985.

== Death ==
Stormie died on November 11, 1990. Her death was related to rejection of the heart transplant she had received in 1984.
