= Skull and crossbones =

Warning sign

☠🕱o

Skull and crossbones
- In Unicode: U+2620 ☠ SKULL AND CROSSBONES; U+1F571 🕱 BLACK SKULL AND CROSSBONES

Related
- See also: U+2623 ☣ BIOHAZARD SIGN; U+2622 ☢ RADIOACTIVE SIGN

A skull and crossbones is a symbol consisting of a human skull and two long bones crossed together under or behind the skull. The design originated in the Late Middle Ages as a symbol of death and especially as a memento mori on tombstones. Actual skulls and bones were long used to mark the entrances to Spanish cemeteries (campo santo).

In modern contexts, it is generally used as a hazard symbol, usually in regard to poisonous substances, such as deadly chemicals.

It is also associated with piracy and software piracy, due to its historical use in some Jolly Roger flags.

== Military use ==
The skull and bones are often used in military insignia, such as the coats of arms of regiments.

Since the mid-18th century, skull and crossbones insignia has been officially used in European armies as symbols of superiority. One of the first regiments was the Frederick the Great's Hussars in 1741, also known as the "Totenkopfhusaren". From this tradition, the skull became an important emblem in the German army. Identical insignia has been used in the Prussian army after the First World War by Freikorps and in Nazi Germany by the Wehrmacht and the SS. The idea of elitism symbolized by the skull and crossbones has influenced sub- and pop culture and has become part of the fashion industry.

== Symbol for poisonous substances ==
The international pictogram for poisonous substances.

EU standard toxic symbol, as defined by Dangerous Substances Directive (67/548/EEC)

The skull and crossbones has long been a standard symbol for poison.

In 1829, New York State required the labeling of all containers of poisonous substances. The skull and crossbones symbol appears to have been used for that purpose since the 1850s. Previously a variety of motifs had been used, including the Danish "+ + +" and drawings of skeletons.

In the 1870s poison manufacturers around the world began using bright cobalt bottles with a variety of raised bumps and designs (to enable easy recognition in the dark) to indicate poison, but by the 1880s the skull and cross bones had become ubiquitous, and the brightly coloured bottles lost their association.

In the United States, due to concerns that the skull-and-crossbones symbol's association with pirates might encourage children to play with toxic materials, the Mr. Yuk symbol was created to denote poison. However, in 2001, the American Association of Poison Control Center voted to continue to require the skull and crossbones symbol.

== Gallery ==
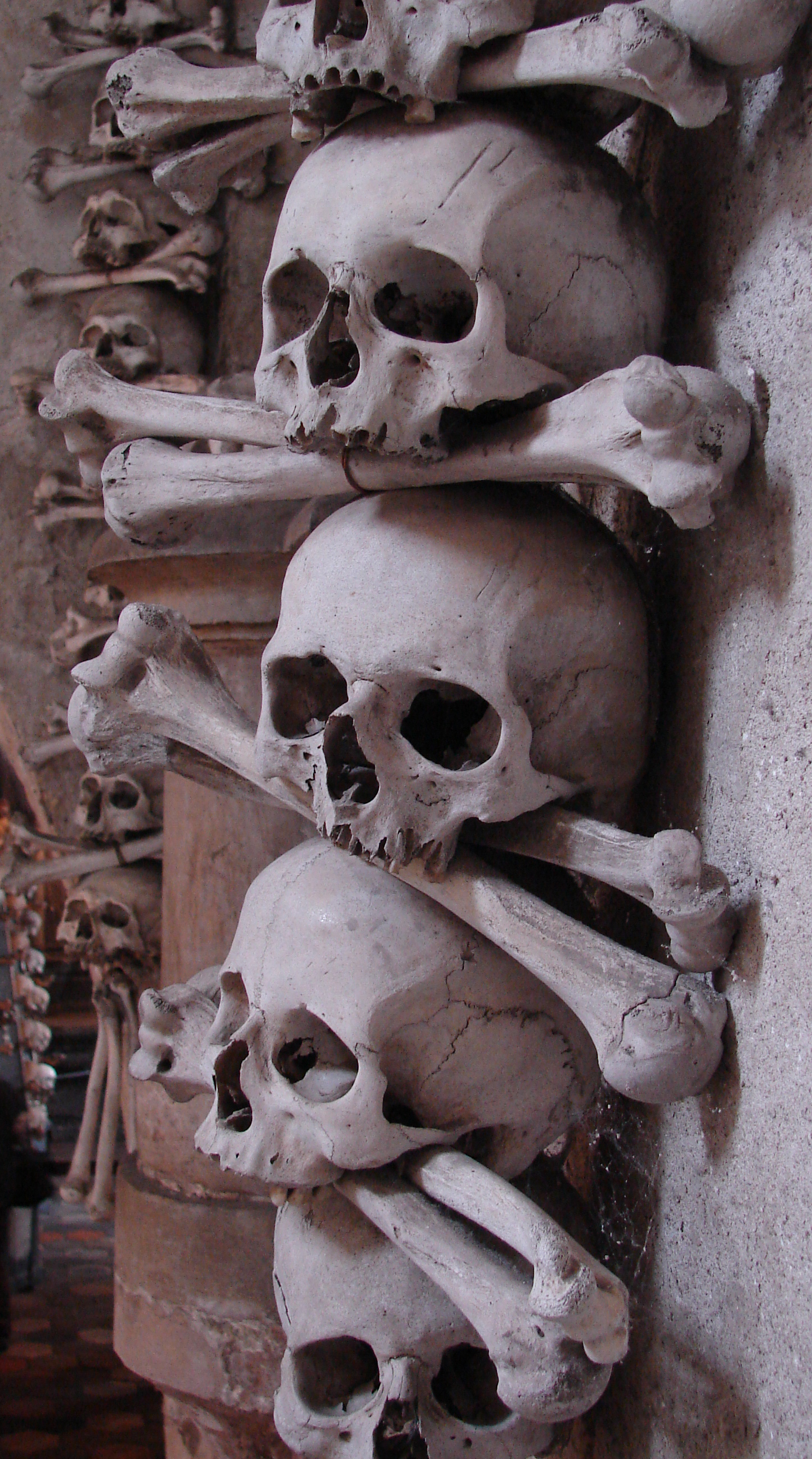
A skull and crossbone arrangement in the Sedlec Ossuary, Czech Republic.

Skull and crossbones as a charge in heraldry on the coat of the 8th Lusitania Cavalry Regiment

An example of a skull and crossbones symbol (memento mori) present on a memorial stone marking the burial location of a William Spink (a merchant) at Wakefield Cathedral in England, dated 1758.

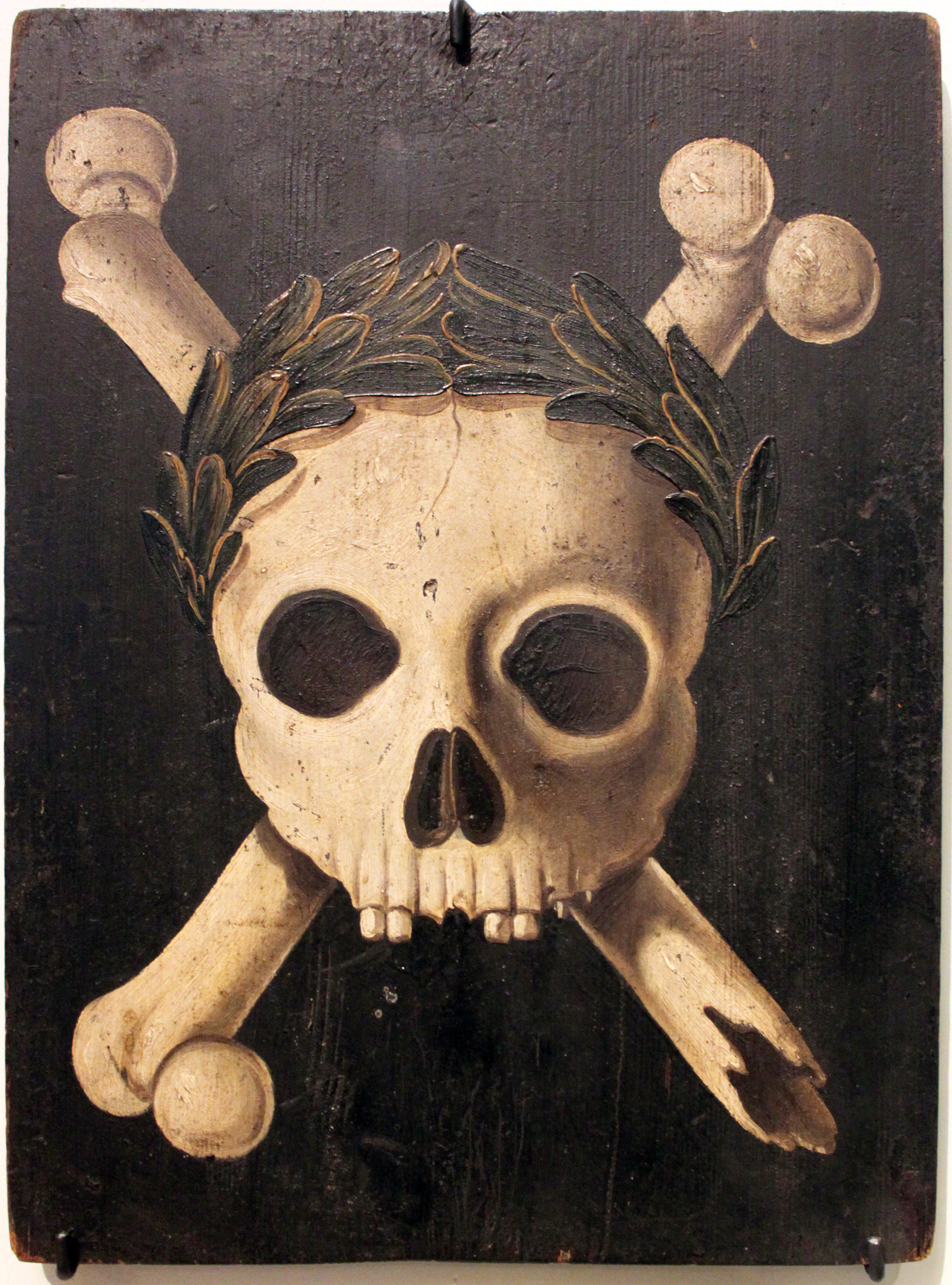
An early 17th-century "plague panel" from Augsburg

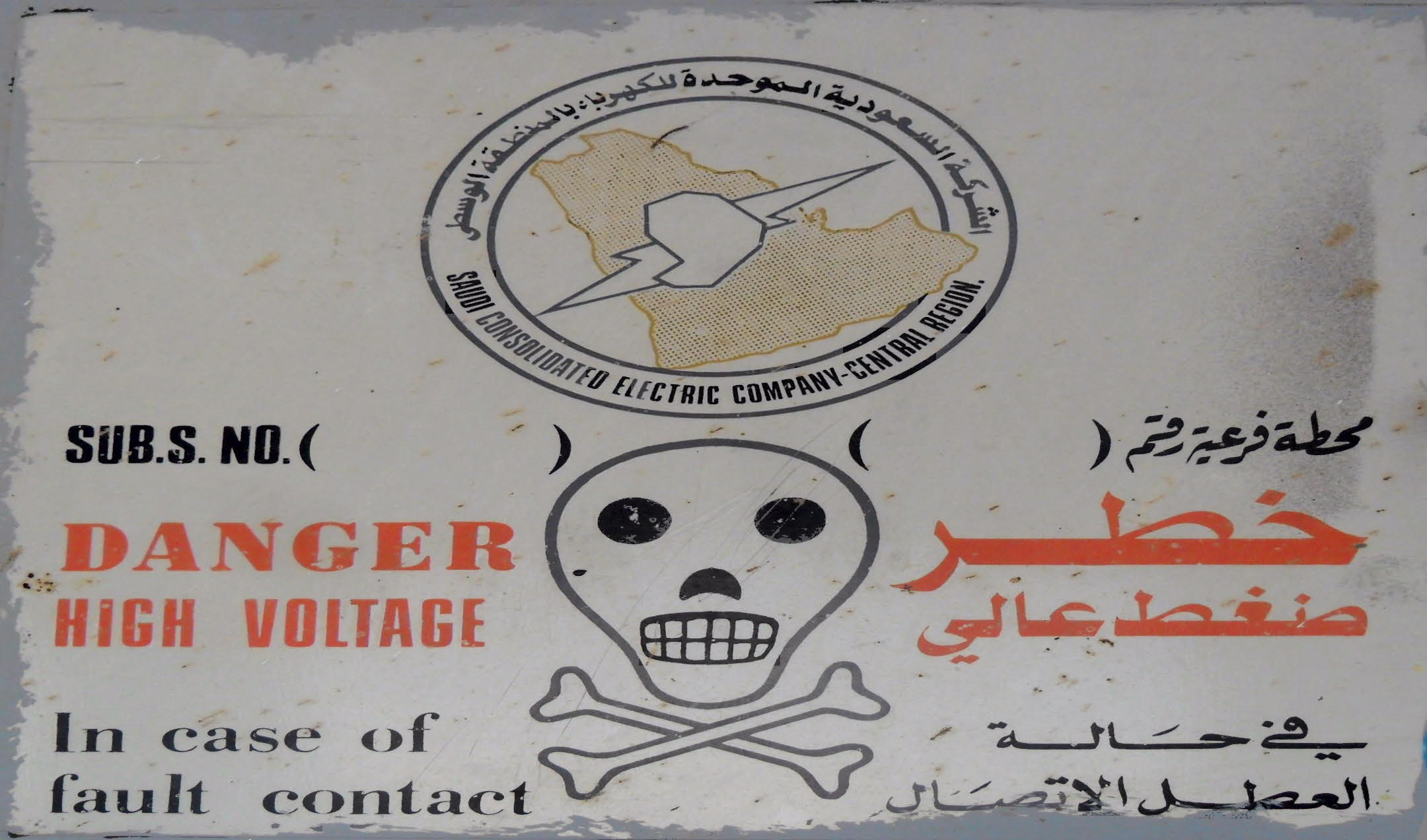
High voltage sign from Saudi Arabia

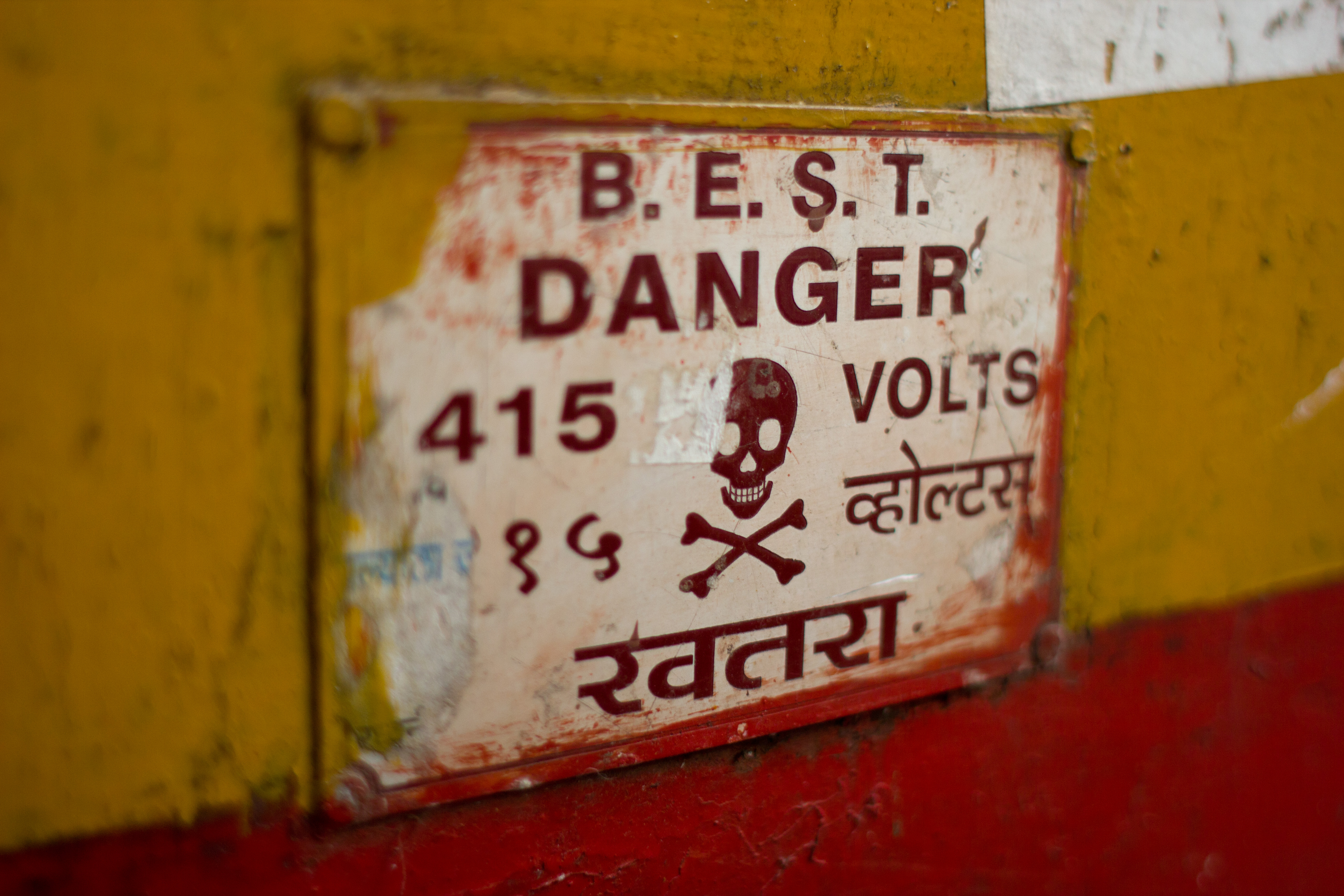
Skull and crossbones on a sign warning of high voltage in Mumbai, India

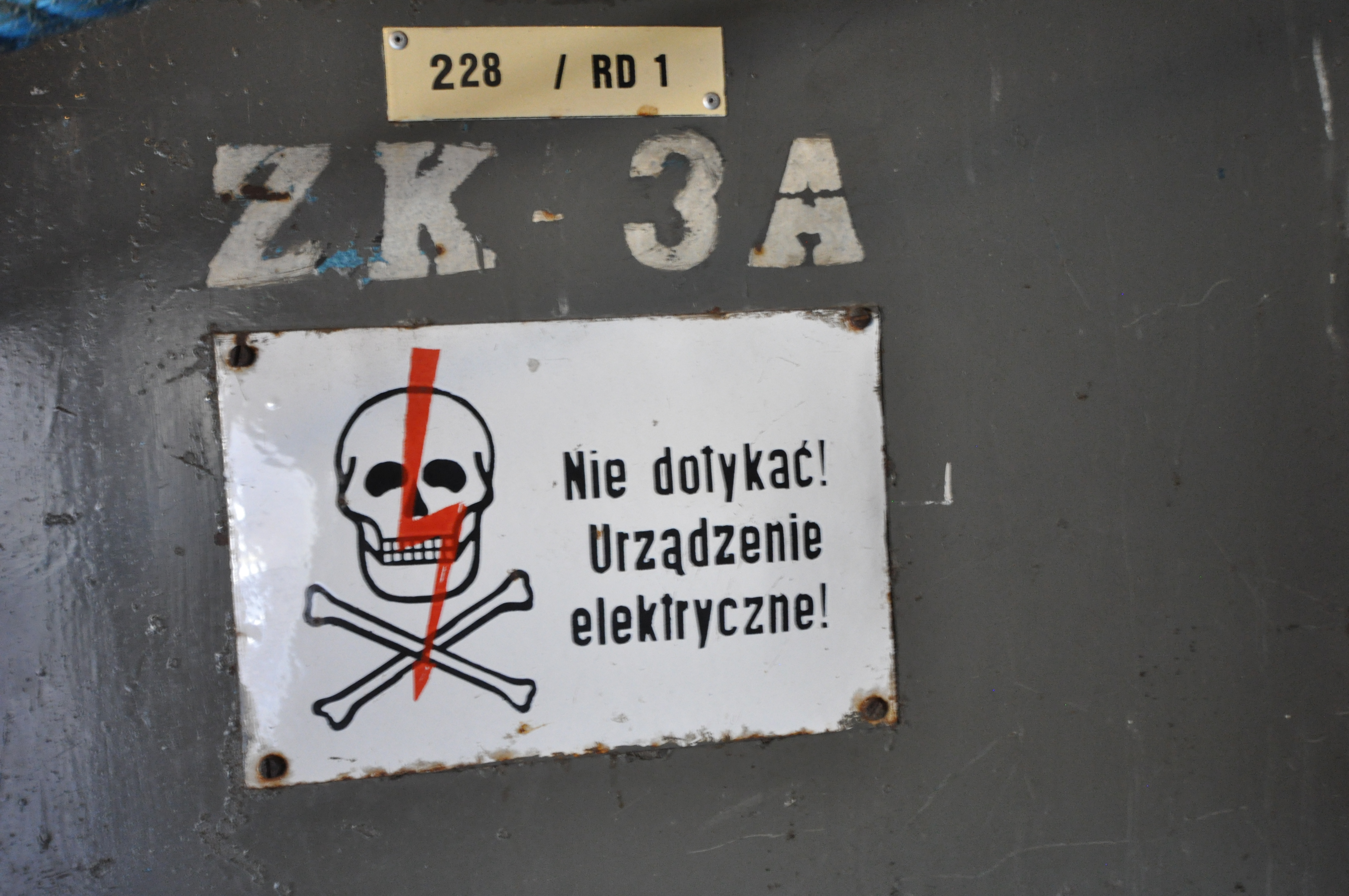
Skull and crossbones sign mounted on a power box in Poland

A typical Jolly Roger ensign as used by Edward England, John Taylor and Samuel Bellamy for example

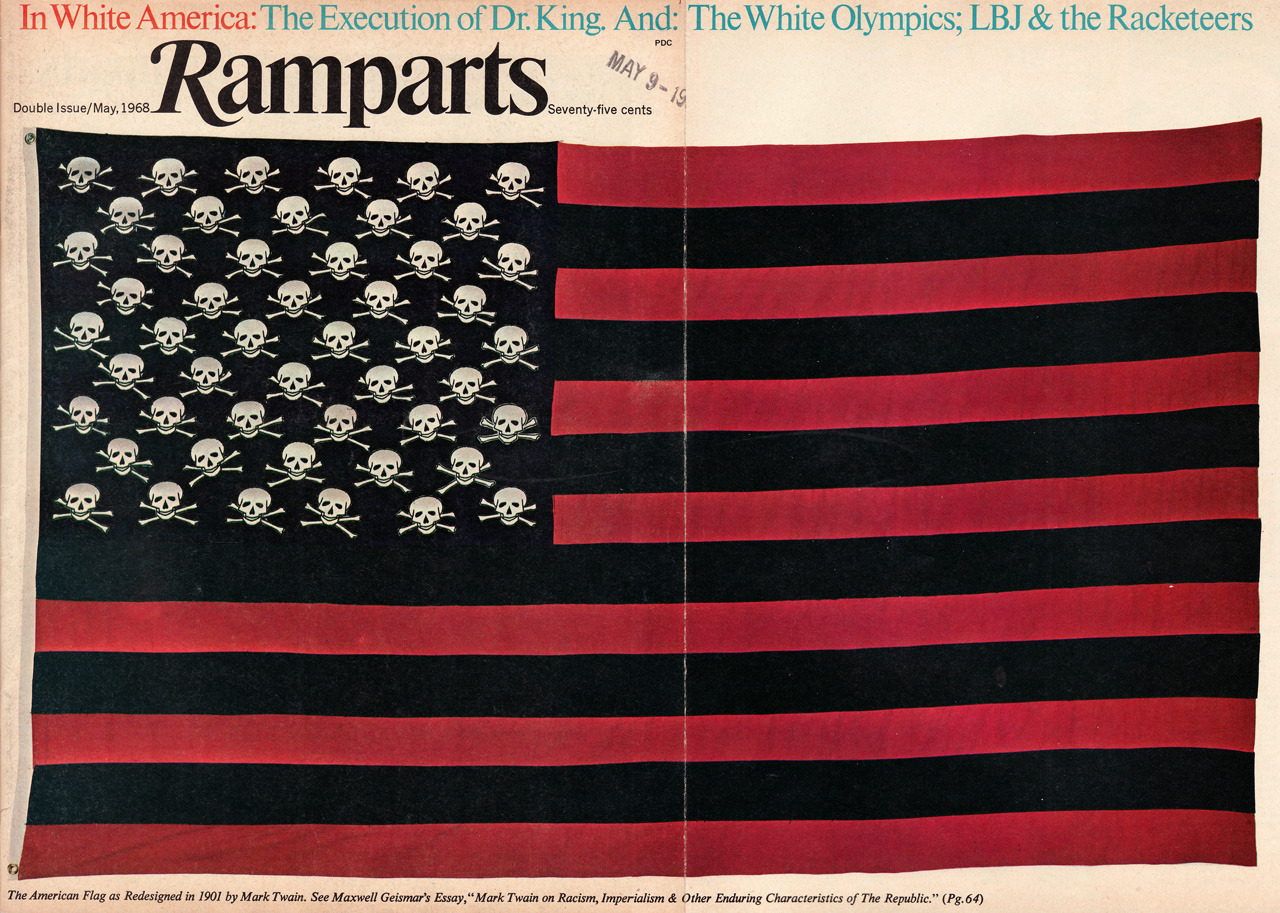
In 1901, Mark Twain wrote a satirical essay titled To the Person Sitting in Darkness, in which he expressed strong anti-imperialist views against certain ongoing conflicts such as the Philippine-American War. At one point, Twain sarcastically described what the flag of an American-controlled Philippines should look like; "And as for a flag for the Philippine Province, it is easily managed. We can have a special one—our States do it: we can have just our usual flag, with the white stripes painted black and the stars replaced by the skull and cross-bones."

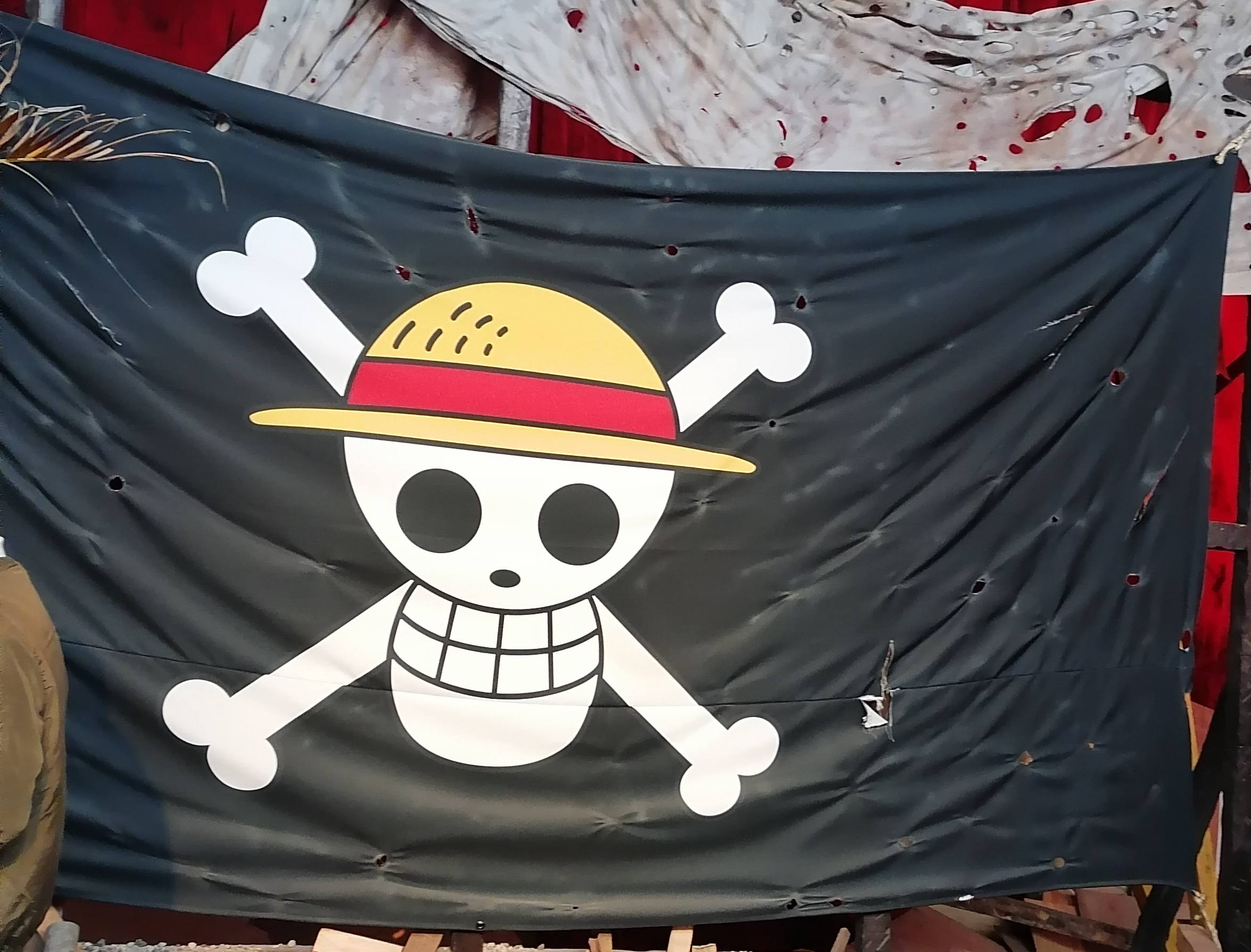
The Straw Hat Pirates' Jolly Roger from One Piece

== See also ==
- Danse Macabre – Artistic motif on the universality of death
- Hazard symbol – Warning symbol on locations or products
- Human skull symbolism – Attachment of symbolic meaning
- Mr. Yuk – Label that indicates poisonous material
- Ossuary – Container for dead remains
- Skull art – Use of skulls and skeletons in art
- Skull and Bones – Secret society at Yale University, US
- Totenkopf – German symbol for skull and crossbones
