= Mr. Yuk =

Label that indicates poisonous material

A Mr. Yuk graphic with the phone number for American Poison Control

Mr. Yuk is a graphic image created and trademarked by UPMC Children's Hospital of Pittsburgh, United States, as a way to label substances that are poisonous if ingested. The graphic was created to be understandable by and visually unappealing to children, and usually carries a telephone number for a poison control center.

== Objective ==
The 1970s Mr. Yuk Public Service Announcement

To help children learn to avoid ingesting poisons, Mr. Yuk was conceived by Richard Moriarty, a pediatrician and clinical professor of pediatrics at the University of Pittsburgh School of Medicine who founded the Pittsburgh Poison Center and the National Poison Center Network. Moriarty felt that the traditional skull and crossbones representing poison was no longer appropriate for children; Congressman William J. Coyne later said that by the 1970s the symbol was "associated with swashbuckling pirates and buccaneers rather than with harmful substances."

The design and color were chosen when Moriarty used focus groups of young children to determine which combination was the most unappealing. Possible expressions were "mad" (crossed eyes and intense expression), "dead" (a sunken mouth and Xs for eyes), and "sick" (a sour expression with the tongue sticking out). Children were asked to rank the faces according to which they liked the best, along with the skull and crossbones, and the "sick" face was least popular. The shade of fluorescent green that was chosen was christened "Yucky!" by a young child and gave the design its name.

== History ==
In 1971, the Pittsburgh Poison Centre issued the Mr. Yuk sticker. Over the next few years, Mr. Yuk stickers were used nationwide to promote poison centres in the United States of America. The stickers usually contained phone numbers of poison control centers that may give guidance if poisoning has occurred or is suspected. Usually, Mr. Yuk stickers carried the national toll-free number 1-800-222-1222. In some areas, local poison control centers and children's hospitals issue stickers with local numbers, under license. A public service announcement was also produced in 1971 featuring a theme song.

== Effectiveness ==
At least two peer-reviewed medical studies (Fergusson 1982, Vernberg 1984) have suggested that Mr. Yuk stickers do not effectively keep young children aged 12-30 months away from potential poisons and may even attract them. Specifically, Vernberg and colleagues note concerns for using the stickers to protect young children. Fergusson and colleagues state that "the method may be effective with older children or as an adjunct to an integrated poisoning prevention campaign".

To evaluate the effectiveness of six projected symbols (skull-and-crossbones, red stop sign, and four others), tests were conducted at day care centers. Children in the program rated Mr. Yuk as the most unappealing image. By contrast, children rated the skull-and-crossbones to be the most appealing.

== Licensing ==
Mr. Yuk and his graphic rendering are registered trademarks and service marks of the UPMC Children's Hospital of Pittsburgh, and the rendering itself is additionally protected by copyright. The Children's Hospital of Pittsburgh of UPMC gives out free sheets of Mr. Yuk stickers if contacted by mail.

== Modern usage ==
Given the evidence regarding the campaign's effectiveness, some poison control centers no longer distribute Mr. Yuk stickers. However, as of May 2024, other poison control centers, such as the Pittsburgh Poison Center continue to offer Mr. Yuk stickers.

== See also ==
- Emoticon
- Hazard symbol
- Long-term nuclear waste warning messages
- Mr. Ouch
- Smiley
- Poison control center
