= Thomas Starzl =

American physician (1926–2017)

Thomas Starzl GCSE
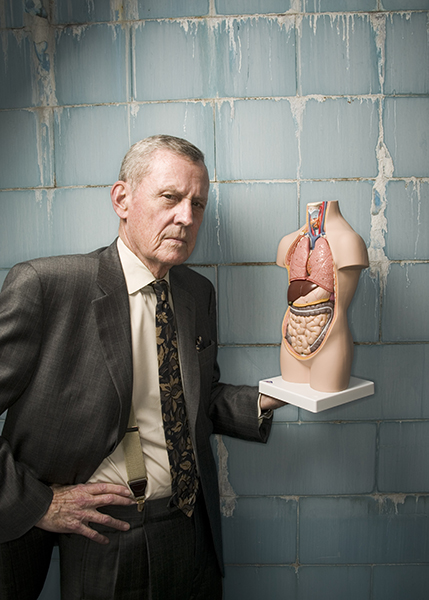
- Starzl in 2005
- Born: Thomas Earl Starzl; March 11, 1926; Le Mars, Iowa, U.S.
- Died: March 4, 2017 (aged 90); Pittsburgh, Pennsylvania, U.S.
- Education: Westminster College (BA); Northwestern University (MD, PhD)
- Known for: Performed the first human liver transplant in 1963; Developed the clinical applications of cyclosporin Contributed to the field of immunosuppression
- Parents: Roman Frederick Starzl (father); Anna Laura Fitzgerald (mother)
- Scientific career
- Fields: Transplantation surgery, Immunology
- Workplaces: University of Pittsburgh; University of Colorado School of Medicine

Thomas Earl Starzl (March 11, 1926 – March 4, 2017) was an American physician, researcher, and expert on organ transplants. He performed the first human liver transplants, and has often been referred to as "the father of modern transplantation". A documentary, titled "Burden of Genius," covering the medical and scientific advances spearheaded by Starzl himself, was released to the public in 2017 in a series of screenings. Starzl also penned his autobiography, The Puzzle People: Memoirs Of A Transplant Surgeon, which was published in 1992.

== Life ==
=== Early years ===
Starzl was born on March 11, 1926, in Le Mars, Iowa, the son of newspaper editor and science fiction writer Roman Frederick Starzl and Anna Laura Fitzgerald who was a teacher and a nurse. Of German and Irish descent, he was the second of four siblings. Originally intending to become a priest in his teenage years, Starzl changed his plans drastically when his mother died from breast cancer in 1947. He briefly served in the United States Navy Reserve after graduating from Le Mars High School in 1944.

=== Education ===
He attended Westminster College in Fulton, Missouri, where he earned a Bachelor of Science degree in biology. Starzl attended Northwestern University Medical School in Chicago, where in 1950 he received a Master of Science degree in anatomy and in 1952 earned both a Doctor of Philosophy in neurophysiology and an M.D. with distinction. While attending medical school, he established a long friendship with Professor Loyal Davis, MD, a neurosurgeon (whose wife Edith Luckett Davis' daughter from her first marriage was Nancy Reagan).

Starzl spent an extra year at medical school, using the additional time to complete a doctorate in neurophysiology, in 1952. He wrote a seminal paper describing a technique to record the electrical responses of deep brain structures to sensory stimuli such as a flash of light or a loud sound. The paper is highly cited, having been referenced in 384 articles by January 2019.

In 1959, he gained a Markle scholarship.

After obtaining his medical degree, Starzl trained in surgery at Johns Hopkins Hospital in Baltimore and Jackson Memorial Hospital in Miami. At both places, he conducted lab and animal research, showing a keen interest in liver biology.

Thomas Starzl after performing a transplant surgery circa 1990

=== Career ===
Starzl was a surgeon and researcher in the then nascent field of organ transplantation at University of Colorado Health Sciences Center from 1962 until his move to University of Pittsburgh School of Medicine in 1981.

The Institute for Scientific Information released information in 1999 that documented that his work had been cited more than any other researcher in the world. Between 1981 and June 1998, he was cited 26,456 times.

His autobiographical memoir, The Puzzle People, was named by The Wall Street Journal as the third best book on doctors' lives and was written in three months.

Starzl's most notable accomplishments include:

- Performing the first human liver transplant in 1963, and the first successful human liver transplant in 1967, both at the University of Colorado Health Sciences Center.
- Establishing the clinical utility of ciclosporin (cyclosporine) in 1982, and tacrolimus in 1991, both leading to Food and Drug Administration approval;
- Development of multiple technical advances in organ preservation, organ procurement and organ transplant;
- Delineating the indications and limitations of abdominal organ transplantation;
- Defining the underlying basis for organ transplantation as a treatment of inherited metabolic diseases (thus providing the rationale for current-day gene therapy efforts), specifically for familial hypercholesterolemia, as in the case of Stormie Jones;
- Recognizing the causative role of immunosuppression in the development of post-transplant lymphoproliferative disease and other opportunistic infections and the utility of reversing the immunosuppressed state as the principal treatment;
- Performing the first simultaneous heart and liver transplant on six-year-old Stormie Jones at Children's Hospital of Pittsburgh in 1984;
- Proposing microchimerism in organ transplant tolerance.

== Awards and honors ==
=== Awards ===
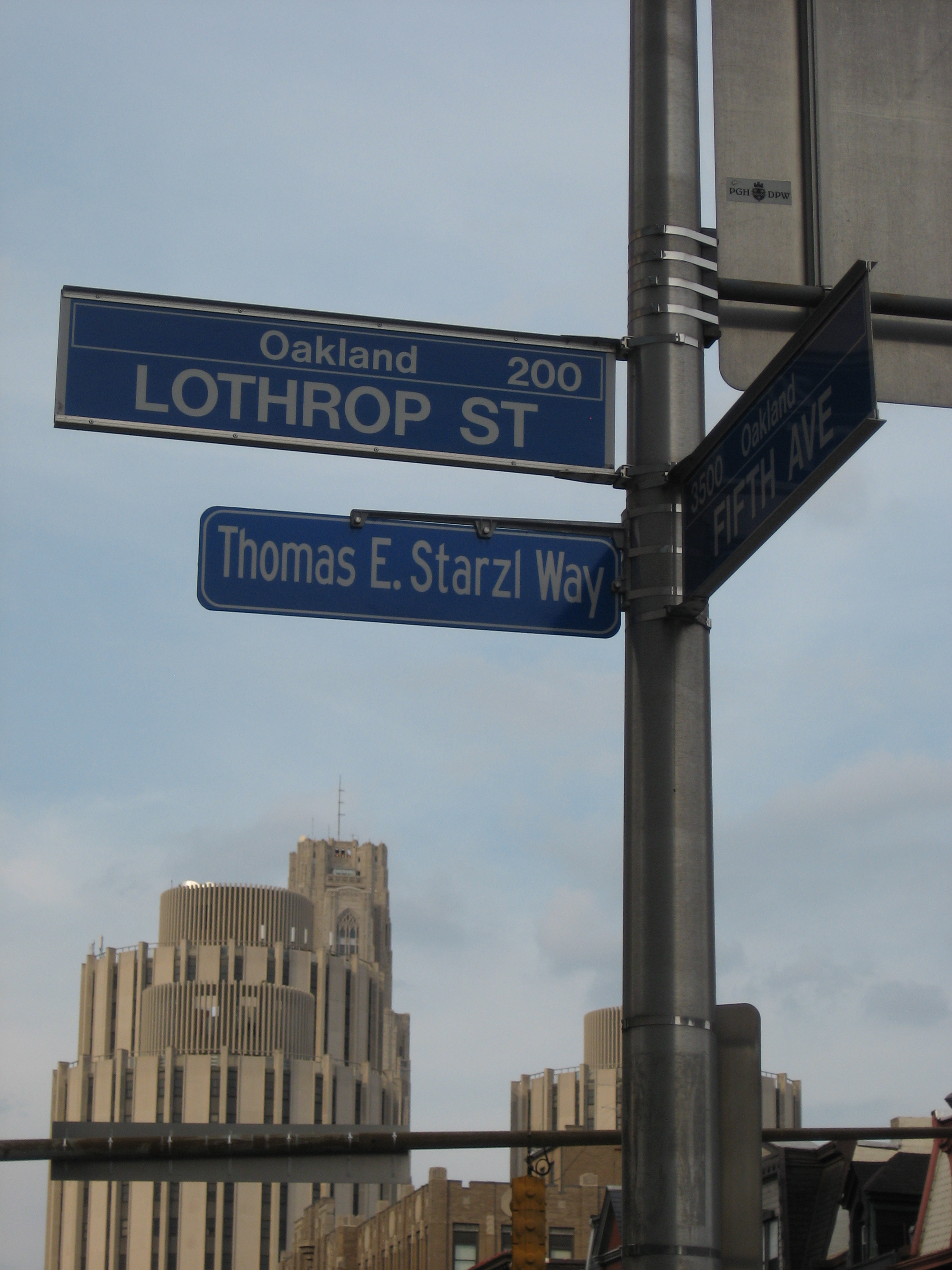
Thomas E. Starzl Way on the campus of the University of Pittsburgh

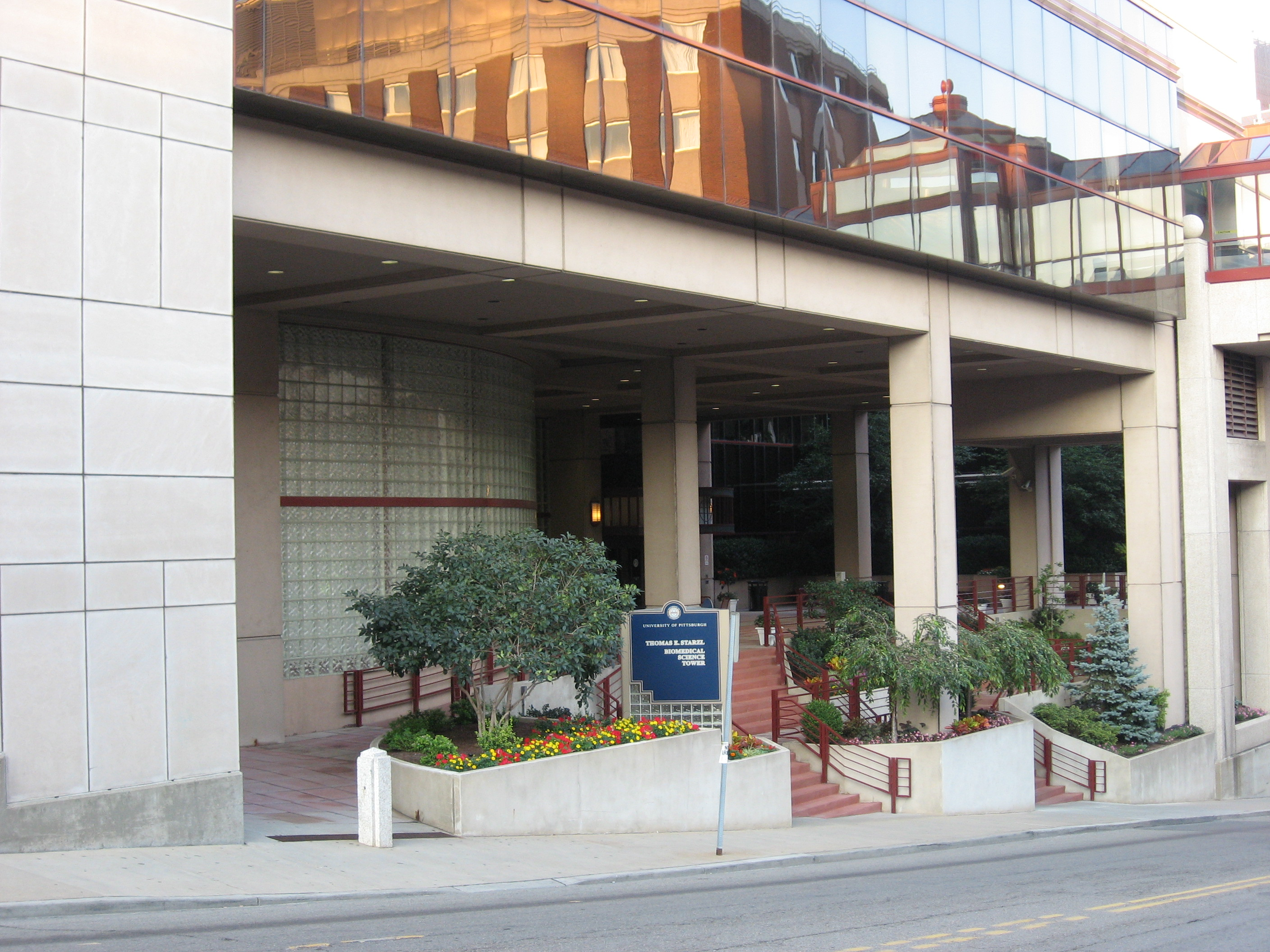
Entrance to the Thomas Starzl Biomedical Research Tower at the University of Pittsburgh.

- Benjamin Franklin Medal for Distinguished Achievement in the Sciences (2016)
- Anthony Cerami Award in Translational Medicine (2015, editors of Molecular Medicine)
- Baruch S. Blumberg Prize (2014, Hepatitis B Foundation)
- Lasker Award (2012, Lasker Foundation) for clinical medical research
- Carnegie Science Chairman's Award (2010, Carnegie Science Center)
- Gustav O. Lienhard Award (2009, National Institute of Medicine)
- Physician of the Year Award for Lifetime Achievement (2009) presented by Castle Connolly Medical.
- National Medal of Science (2004), presented by President George W. Bush at the White House in 2006
- John Scott Award (2004)
- King Faisal International Prize for Medicine (2001)
- Elected member of the American Philosophical Society (1999)
- Lannelongue International Medal (1998, Académie Nationale de Chirurgie)
- Jacobson Innovation Award (1995, American College of Surgeons)
- Peter Medawar Prize (1992, The Transplantation Society)
- William Beaumont Prize in Gastroenterology (1991, American Gastroenterological Association)
- Distinguished Service Award (1991, American Liver Foundation)
- Golden Plate Award, (1983 American Academy of Achievement)
- David M. Hume Memorial Award (1978, National Kidney Foundation)
- Brookdale Award in Medicine (1974, American Medical Association)
- Bigelow Medal (Boston Surgical Society)
- City of Medicine Award

Starzl was named one of the most important people of the Millennium, ranking No. 213, according to the authors of "1,000 Years, 1,000 People: Ranking the Men and Women Who Shaped the Millennium " (Kodansha America, 332 pp.)

Starzl has also received honorary degrees from 26 universities in the United States and abroad, which include 12 in Science, 11 in Medicine, 2 in Humane Letters, and 1 in Law.

In 2006, at a celebration for his 80th birthday, the University of Pittsburgh renamed one of its newest medical research buildings the Thomas E. Starzl Biomedical Science Tower in recognition of his achievements and contributions to the field. On October 15, 2007, the Western Pennsylvania American Liver Foundation and the City of Pittsburgh honored Starzl by dedicating Lothrop Street, near his office and the biomedical research tower bearing his name, as "Thomas E. Starzl Way".

A statue honoring Starzl was unveiled on June 24, 2018 on the University of Pittsburgh campus near the school's Cathedral of Learning.

=== Honors ===
- Grand-Cross of the Military Order of Saint James of the Sword, Portugal (13 November 1995)

== Retirement ==
Having retired from clinical and surgical service since 1991, Starzl devoted his time to research endeavors and remained active as professor of surgery at the University of Pittsburgh School of Medicine and the University of Pittsburgh Medical Center's (UPMC) program named in his honor: the Thomas E. Starzl Transplantation Institute. Since his "retirement," he earned the additional distinctions of being one of the most prolific scientists in the world as well as the most cited scientist in the field of clinical medicine.

== See also ==
- Organ donation
- Xenotransplantation
- Immunosuppressive drugs
- Transplant rejection
