= UPMC Children's Hospital of Pittsburgh =

Children's hospital in Pittsburgh, Pennsylvania, United States

- University of Pittsburgh Medical Center

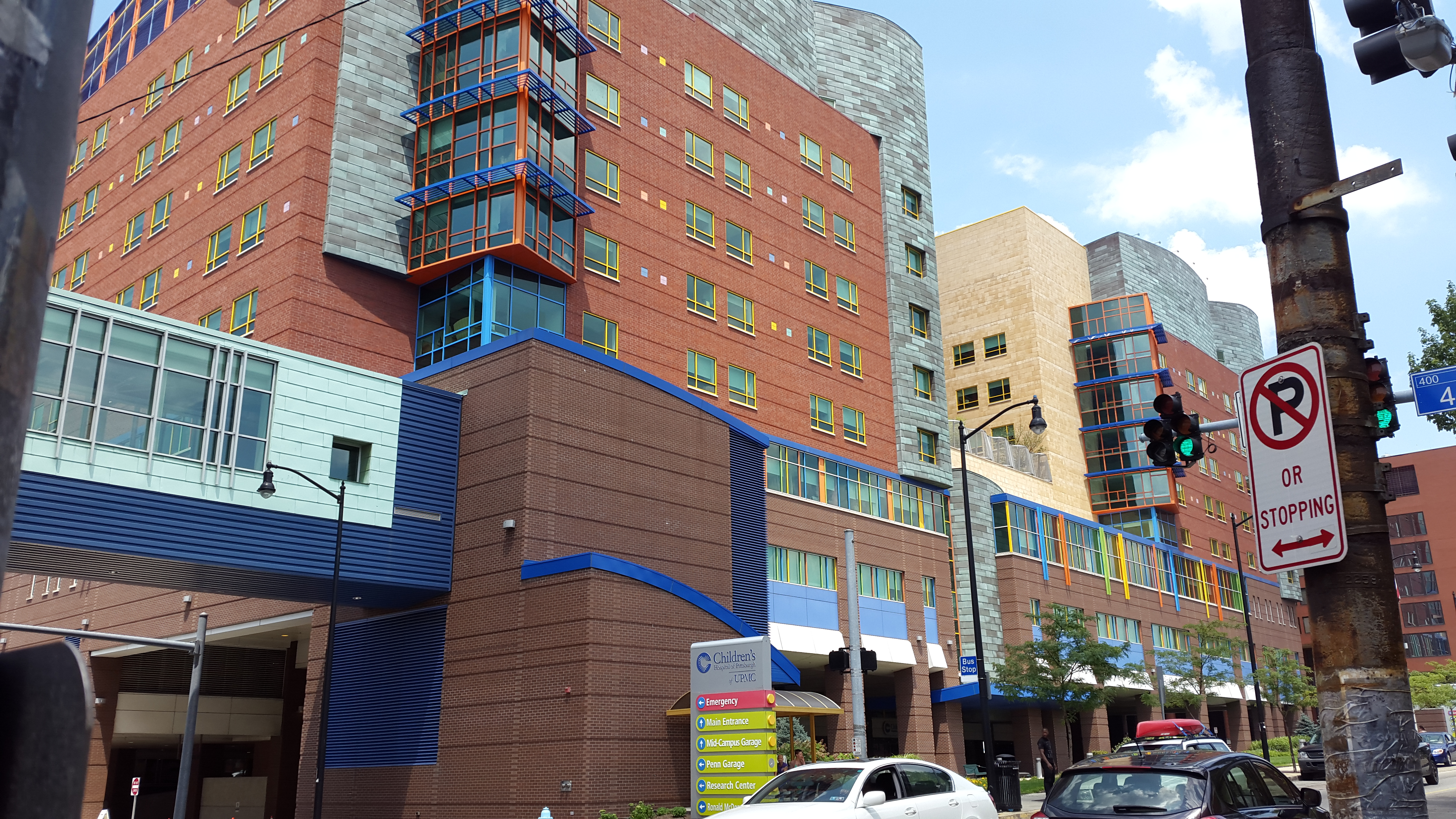
- UPMC CHP in Lawrenceville, Pennsylvania

Geography
- Location: 4401 Penn Avenue, Pittsburgh, Pennsylvania, U.S.
- Coordinates: 40.4670°N 79.9531°W

Organisation
- Type: Teaching
- Affiliated university: University of Pittsburgh School of Medicine

Services
- Emergency department: Level 1 Pediatric Trauma Center
- Beds: 317

Helipads
- Helipad: FAA LID: 30PN
| Number | Length | | Surface |
| Number | ft | m | Surface |
|---|---|---|---|
| H1 | 45 x 45 | 14 × 14 | Rooftop |

History
- Former names: Pittsburgh Children's Hospital (1883–1909); Children's Hospital of Pittsburgh (1909–2001); Children's Hospital of Pittsburgh of UPMC (2001–2018); UPMC Children's Hospital of Pittsburgh (2018–present)
- Constructed: 2006
- Founded: Original: March 18, 1887; Oakland: November 1, 1926; Current: May 2, 2009

Links
- Website: www.chp.edu

UPMC Children's Hospital of Pittsburgh (CHP), popularly known simply as Children's, is part of the University of Pittsburgh Medical Center and the only hospital in Greater Pittsburgh dedicated solely to the care of infants, children, teens and young adults through around age 26. UPMC Children's also sometimes treats older adults that require pediatric care. The hospital is affiliated with the University of Pittsburgh School of Medicine and features a state-verified level 1 pediatric trauma center, one of four in the state. CHP also has a rooftop helipad for urgent transport of pediatric patients. UPMC Children's Hospital is a nationally and regionally ranked Children's Hospital.

Care is provided by more than 700 board-certified pediatricians and pediatric specialists. Children's also provides primary care, specialty care, and urgent care at over 40 locations throughout the Pittsburgh region, as well as clinical specialty services throughout western Pennsylvania at regional health care facilities.

== History ==
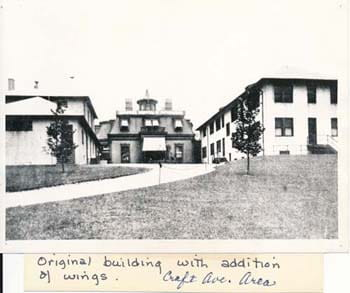
The original building of Children's Hospital of Pittsburgh before fire

=== Origins ===
The history of the hospital goes back to 1883 when 11-year-old Kirk LeMoyne wanted to start a hospital dedicated to babies and children. Through fundraising, he managed to create a bed for children at Western Pennsylvania Hospital. With the extra money, LeMoyne started a fund for a dedicated children's hospital. In 1887, local philanthropist Jane Holmes donated $40,000 to the hospital, with the condition that the hospital be built within one year.

Children's Hospital of Pittsburgh was founded by a charter on March 18, 1887, and the first patients were admitted on June 5, 1890.

In 1909, the hospital's name was officially changed from Pittsburgh Children's Hospital to the Children's Hospital of Pittsburgh.

The original hospital was housed in a donated mansion refurbished for medical use. The facility was quickly outgrown and two additions were added within ten years. After a small fire at the mansion, fundraising began for a much larger facility, which was established in 1926 at the DeSoto Street location in the Oakland section of Pittsburgh.

=== Former Oakland neighborhood facility ===
The oldest of the Children's Hospital buildings, dating to the 1930s, included an eight-story building, later called the DeSoto Wing, that included a cafe, gift shop and chapel. North and south additions to the original building were added in 1950 and 1957, respectively.

In 1947, doctor Jonas Salk took a job at Children's and at the University of Pittsburgh School of Medicine as an associate professor of bacteriology and the head of the Virus Research Lab. While at Pitt, he began research on polio and the process of developing a vaccination. In 1952 Salk had created the first Polio vaccination. Salk went on CBS radio to report a successful test on a small group of adults and children on March 26, 1953, and two days later, the results were published in The Journal of the American Medical Association.

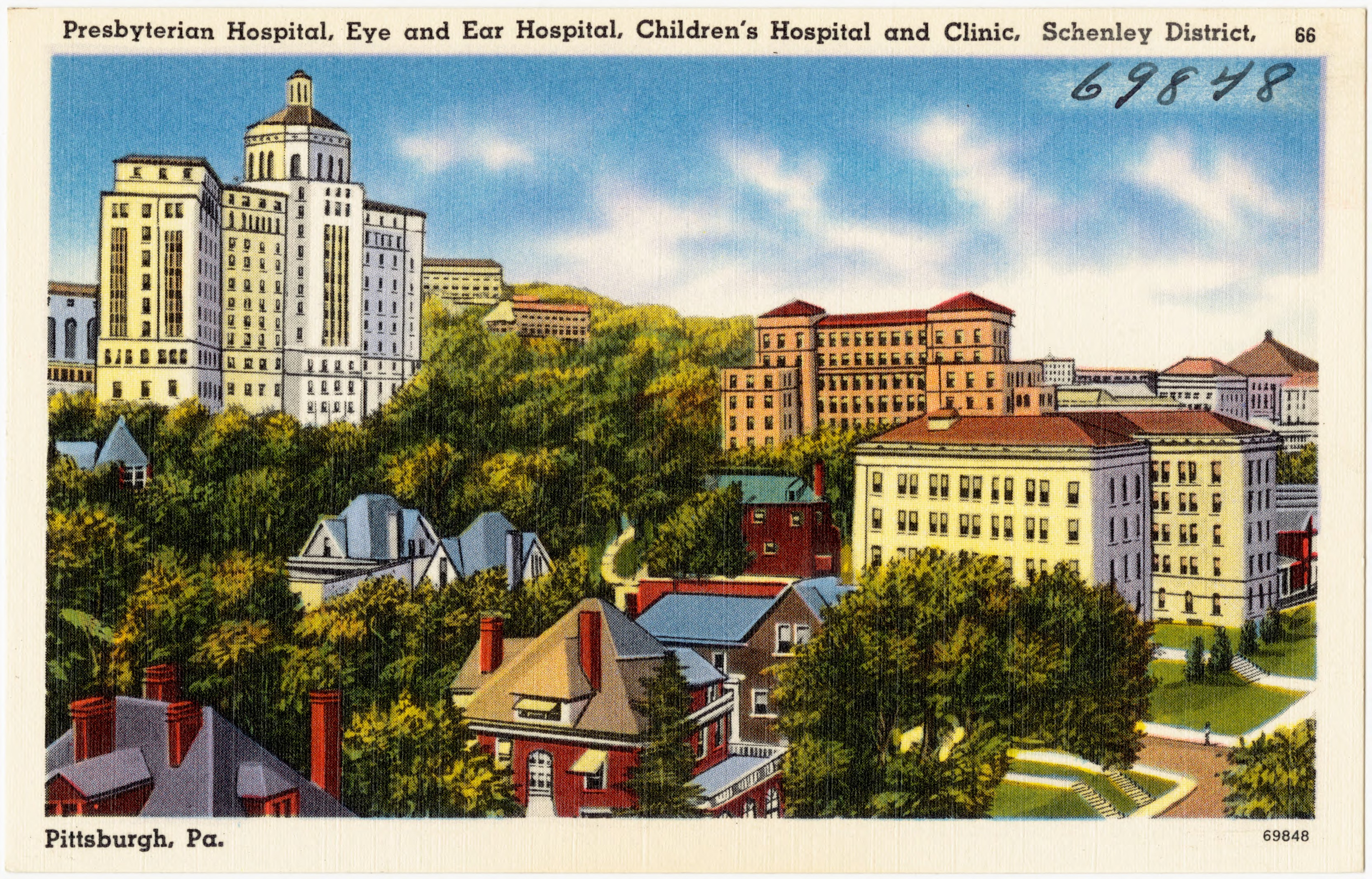
A picture of Presbyterian Hospital, Eye and Ear Hospital, and the Oakland Children's Hospital. Circa 1930–45

In 1971 hospital physician Dr. Richard Moriarty created the campaign, logo, and sticker for Mr. Yuk at the hospital. Moriarty noticed an uptick in children's poisonings and wanted to develop a label to warn children that poisons were dangerous. The design for Mr. Yuk came from interviews from children under the age of five and recording their facial expressions when asked about poison. The hospital still owns the copyright to the Mr. Yuk sticker. The Pittsburgh Poison Control Center was housed inside of CHP.

In 1981 pioneering surgeon and "Father of Transplantation" Dr. Thomas E. Starzl came to the hospital, on condition that he would be free of administrative tasks and able to focus on medicine. In a matter of a few years he launched the country's first pediatric and adult liver transplant program. On February 14, 1984, under the direction of Starzl, Drs. Byers W. Shaw Jr. and Henry T. Bahnson successfully completed the world's' first simultaneous heart and liver organ transplant on six-year-old Stormie Jones at the Children's Hospital of Pittsburgh. During his tenure, Starzl also pioneered the use of a new anti-rejection drug called tacrolimus. Starzl was the head of transplantation at the hospital until 1991 when he stepped down from clinical and surgical duties and shifted all of his focus to research.

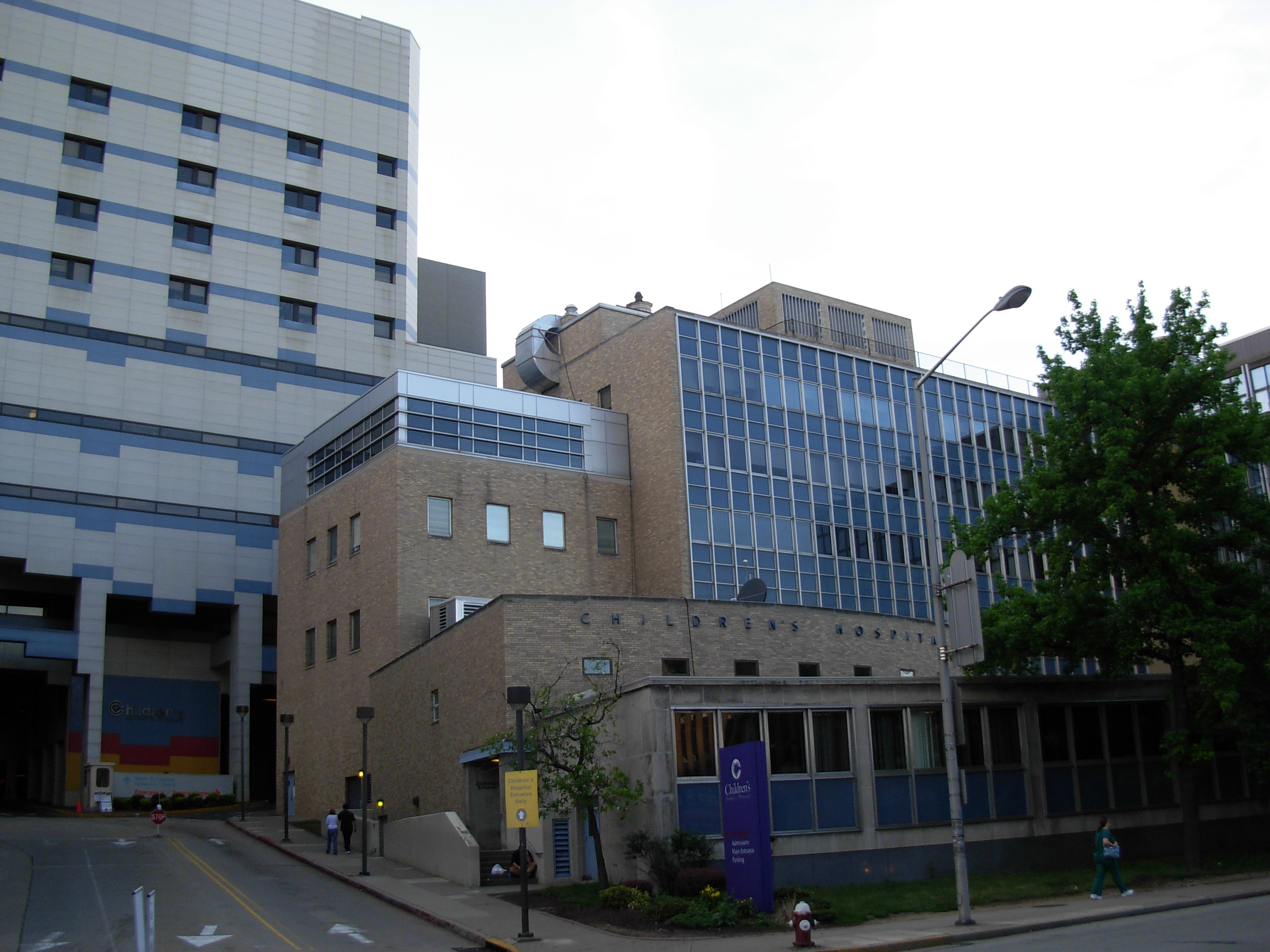
The Children's Hospital in Oakland as it appeared in 2007

Ground was broken in 1982, and in January 1986 a new tower called the "Main Tower" was opened at the hospital. Opening was delayed after a slight issue led to a leaking pipe. The addition consisted of twelve floors (two underground parking), 210 patient beds, and cost $92 million. The Main Tower had a rooftop heliport and was the location of the emergency department and was connected to the older buildings with connections to UPMC Presbyterian Hospital that were accessed through multiple floors. The new tower also included an underground parking garage, new lobby, pediatric and neonatal intensive care units, operating rooms, and a radiology department shared with the neighboring Presbyterian Hospital. The new building opened up with an open house and tours for the public.

On April 5, 2001, CHP and UPMC announced a merger. As a part of the agreement, UPMC would provide CHP with $250 million in research support over 10 years, including funds for new faculty and facilities and also contribute $250 million toward a new hospital to replace Children's aging Oakland facilities. Originally, Highmark was also in the running to merge with Children's, but they only wanted to put $100 million towards a new hospital, $400 million less than UPMC.

A few months later insurance company Highmark filed suit to block Children's planned merger with UPMC, claiming that UPMC could use the region's only pediatric hospital as part of a plan to build its own insurance business by blocking access to CHP for patients with other coverage. By October 19, 2001, Highmark dropped the lawsuit against CHP when they were able to reach an agreement with UPMC. The merger was complete by October 31, 2001.

The old Children's Hospital location was closed on May 2, 2009, when the hospital moved to the Lawrenceville location. After the closure, the structure served as overflow space for patients from neighboring Presbyterian Hospital.

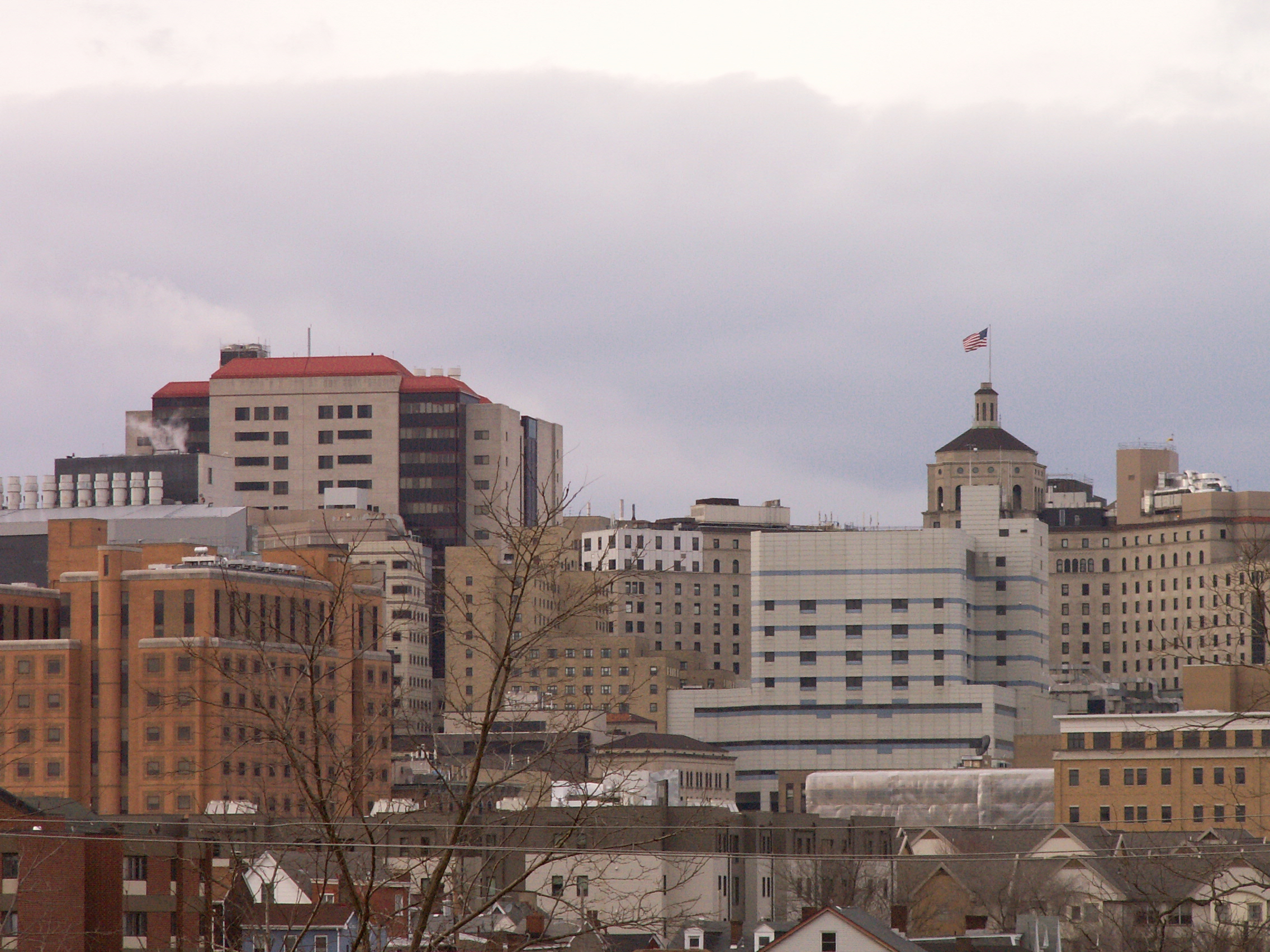
View of the UPMC Presbyterian campus (right) in 2014 with the former Children's Hospital tower standing in front

On December 18, 2009, UPMC announced plans to demolish a large section of the former Children's Hospital, including the building on the corner of Fifth Avenue and DeSoto Street. However the blue banded main tower which was constructed in 1986 remained as part of UPMC Presbyterian partially because UPMC Presbyterian used the rooftop helipad and CHP also contained offices for UPMC Presbyterian.

The demolition took place in July 2010, and though it was scheduled to be finished in October that year, the removal of asbestos and other factors delayed the progress until the demolition was complete in May 2011. Later that month it was landscaped as park, although UPMC has plans to build the UPMC Heart and Transplant Hospital on its footprint. In 2016, the former main tower of the Children's Hospital was also demolished.

=== Talks of a new hospital ===
Ideas were floating around as early as 2000 when CHP conducted a study to determine the cost of renovating the original hospital on Fifth Avenue and DeSoto Street in Oakland, contracting RossBianco Architect to create a master plan. Throughout the years the additions created an environment that was confusing to navigate. They determined it would cost about $185 million to upgrade electrical systems and rooms, but wouldn't address problems with the outdated hospital design itself. In addition, there was no room for expansion and patient volumes were straining the 263-bed hospital.

Hospital administration instead refocused on building a brand new hospital or finding another building onto which a new children's hospital could be attached. A few sites were considered including a lot next to UPMC Magee-Women's Hospital, which was ultimately not chosen due to the lack of expansion potential. A lot at LTV Steel site along the Monongahela River was also considered and turned down due to the potential cost of environmental cleanup that option entailed. Also, the area behind UPMC Montefiore was inquired upon but faced the same expansion problems as the Magee-Women's proposal.

As plans were being drawn up, leaders from the St. Francis Medical Center in Lawrenceville announced that they would be closing due to long-term financial struggles and were looking for a buyer. After financial donations from Highmark, UPMC officials decided to purchase the St. Francis Medical Center, providing large amounts of land and expansion potential.

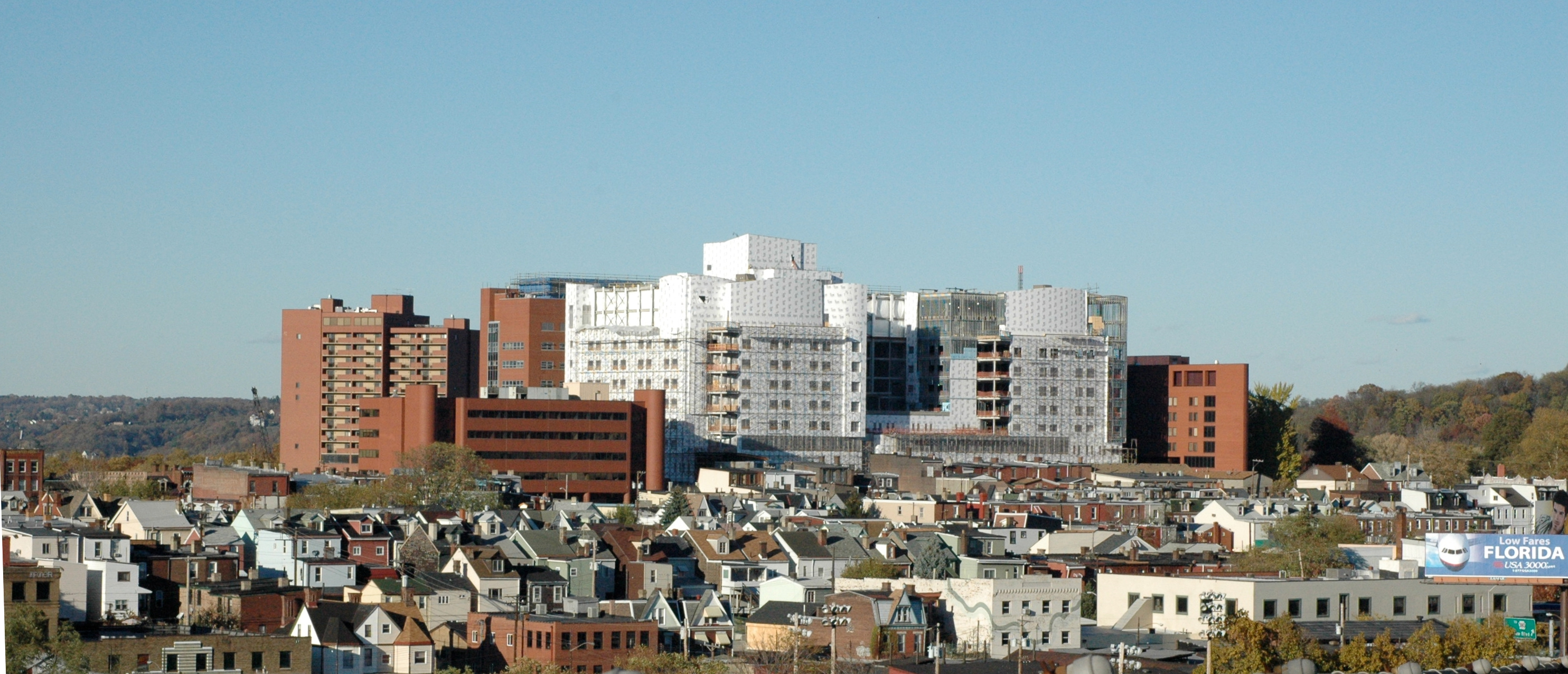
The new hospital under construction in 2006

=== New hospital campus ===
After acquiring the land, UPMC officials drew up plans for the site that included the demolition of a few buildings, but kept about four buildings from the old hospital, choosing to renovate them instead. The decision reduced overall construction costs for the project as not as many buildings were required to be constructed. Buildings still existing from St. Francis days include the Plaza Building, Faculty Building, Administrative Office Building, and the back half of the main hospital. Construction workers are blending the old and new buildings by matching floor and ceiling heights.

Throughout the construction of the project, costs increased and UPMC continuously disputed the additions, trying to save money. After a few trimmings from the original design UPMC and Children's agreed and UPMC paid for most of the project. The architect for the new hospital building was Louis D. Astorino.

Early demolition of buildings not required started soon after the deal and construction and renovations for CHP started in 2006 completed in April 2009, originally opening to outpatients, the hospital fully opened on May 2, 2009. Transport of patients from the Oakland campus to Lawrenceville consisted of a convoy of 34 ambulances to transport about 150 patients over a 10-hour window. Medical equipment was transferred over the next day, May 3.

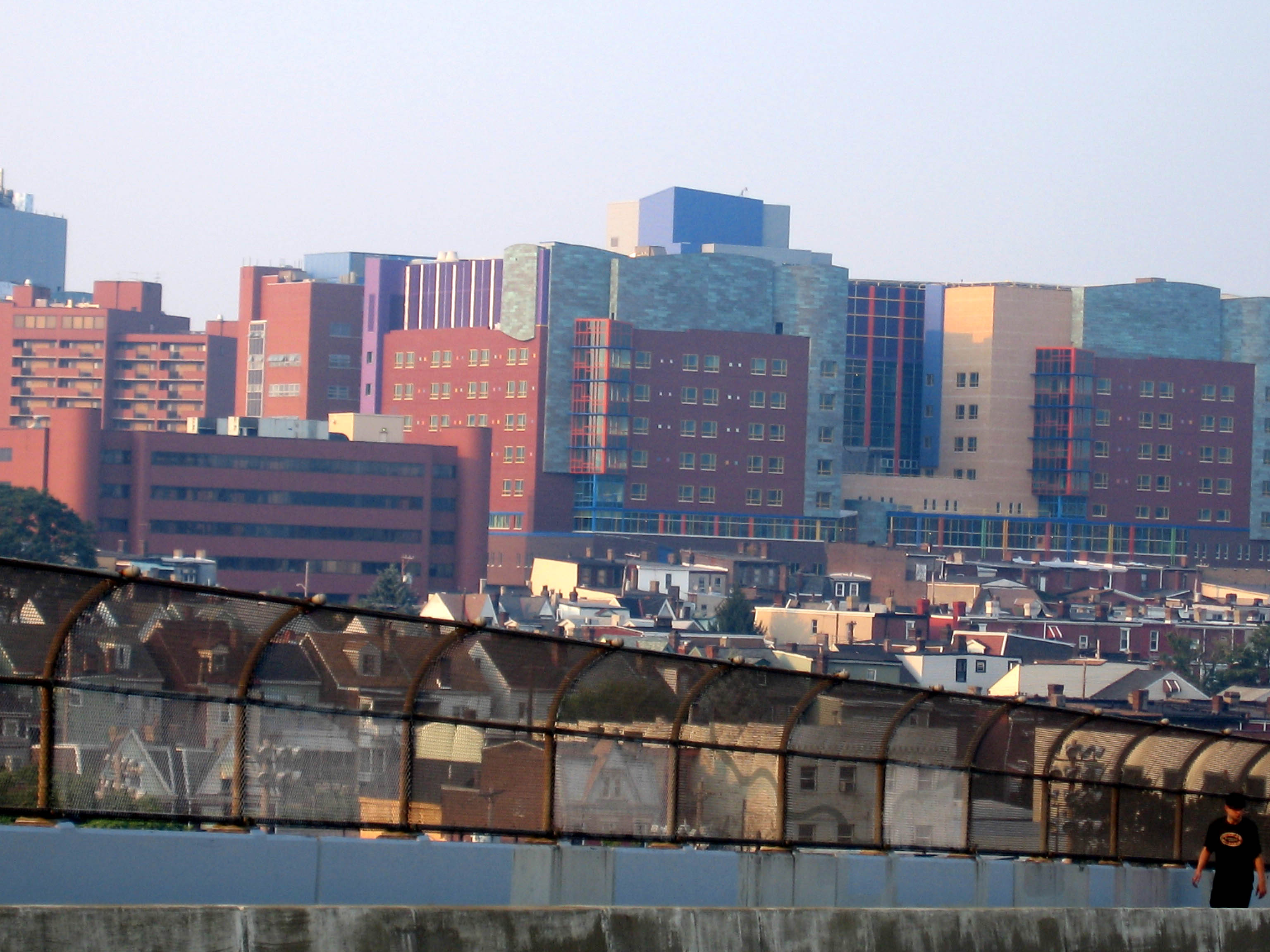
The building in 2010

Patient rooms at the new hospital were much larger consisting of 300 square feet per room, 1.5 times larger than the rooms at the old campus in Oakland. In addition, rooms at the new hospital are completely private featuring an overnight couch with pull out bed for caregivers. The new 1,500,000-square-foot (140,000 m^{2}) hospital has 315 beds, with a 45-bed emergency department, a 36-bed pediatric intensive care unit, and a 12-bed cardiac intensive care unit. A ten-story research center is also on the campus, with seven out of the ten floors dedicated for pediatric medical research. The complex is environmentally friendly and "quiet". The hospital also includes a Weight Management and Wellness Center to offer help to obese children. The Center assists children in the area with maintaining and achieving a healthy weight, while also treating weight related health issues. Along with the physical upgrades, CHP implemented an advanced new electronic health record system (EHR) as a part of the new hospital.

In January 2010, UPMC Children's Hospital of Pittsburgh received 53 orphan children from Haiti after the earthquake. CHP treated the children and then turned them over to the Allegheny County Children and Youth Services to find permanent homes.

When the hospital first opened, residents in Lawrenceville complained about the loud noises that the rooftop ventilation fans made and CHP officials were quick to hire acoustic engineers, spending around $250,000 to find a solution to the noise issues.

In 2011, the main building of the hospital became one of the first LEED certified children's hospital buildings in the U.S. The same year, CHP also bid on a plot of land in South Fayette, Pennsylvania to build a new $24 million outpatient center. The bid was approved and the new outpatient center (Children's Hospital of Pittsburgh South) opened in 2014.

In 2014, CHP leaders announced that they would undergo an expansion of the NICU because of the limited capacity. The announcement also came with expansions of the outpatient hematology clinic, the bone marrow transplant unit, the cardiac unit, and the telemedicine program due to increased demand since the move to Lawrenceville.

In February 2016, UVA Children's Hospital in Virginia partnered with CHP to expand their pediatric liver transplant program, learning from the program already existing at CHP.

In the wake of the 2020 Coronavirus pandemic the hospital revised its visitor policy to only allow two parents of each child on the inpatient wards. The parents must also wear masks, and be the same two people throughout the entire stay.

In November 2020, UPMC announced the opening of the new pediatric unit at UPMC Pinnacle Harrisburg. The new unit was opened in partnership with the UPMC Children's Hospital of Pittsburgh and consists of 26 pediatric beds. The unit is named "UPMC Children's Harrisburg" and features telemedicine connections to the main hospital in Pittsburgh.

== About ==
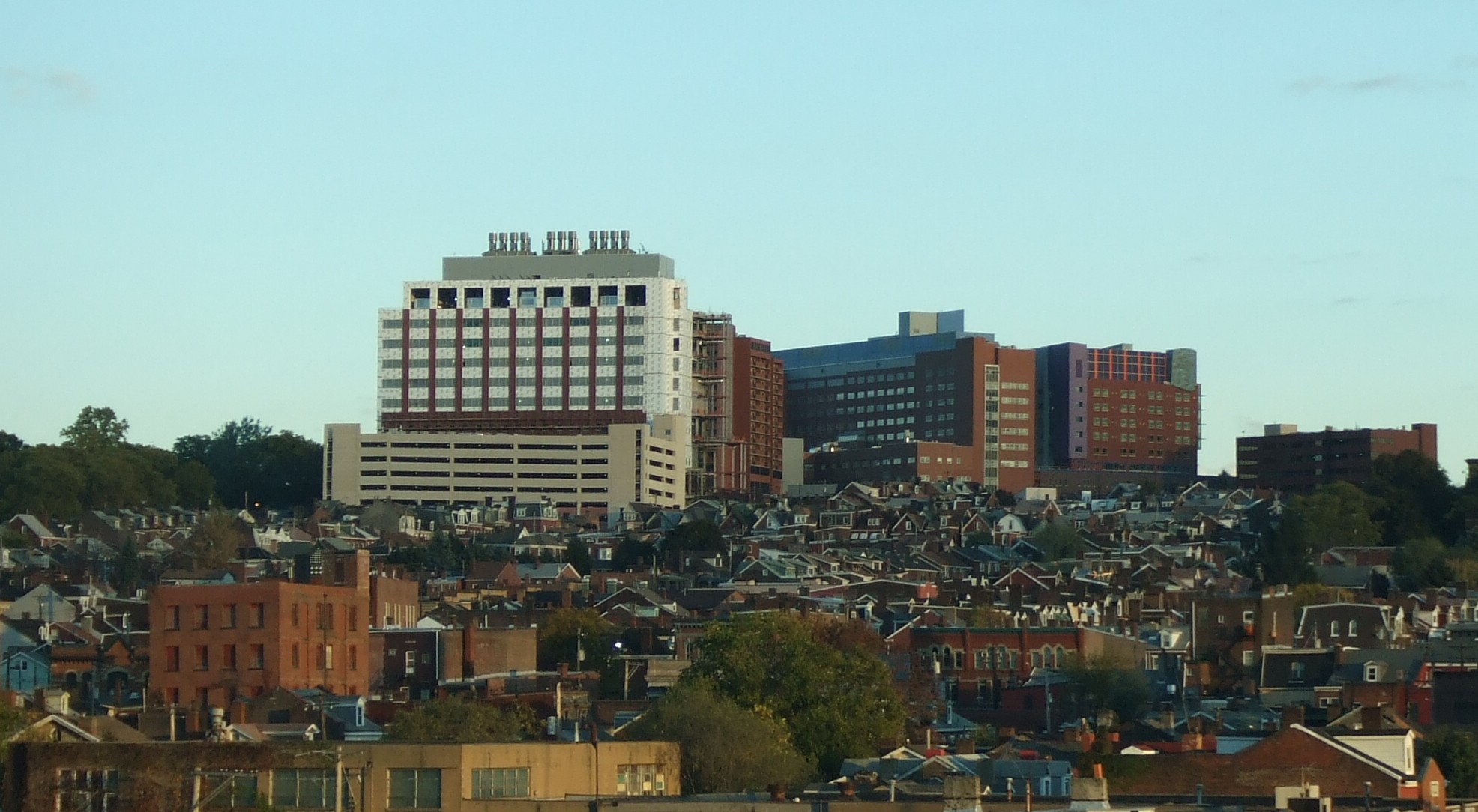
In the photo, the site is under construction. The first building from the left (with white Tyvek) is the John G. Rangos Sr. Research Center. To its right, the colorful building, is the main hospital. Buildings not easily visible in image: faculty pavilion, administrative office building, and a central plant.

=== Patient care units ===
The hospital has a variety of patient care units to care for infants, children, teens and young adults 0-21, with some units caring for adult patients as well.

| Beds | Floor | Unit | Ages |
|---|---|---|---|
| 41-bed | 1 | Pediatric Emergency Department | 0-21 |
| 12-bed | 4 | Cardiac Intensive Care Unit (CICU) | all ages (achd) |
| 36-bed | 5 | Pediatric Intensive Care Unit (PICU) | 0-21 |
| 24-bed | 6A | Pediatric Ortho/Neuro/Trauma | 0-21 |
| 23-bed | 6B | Pediatric Surgery Unit | 0-21 |
| 8-bed | 6E | Pediatric Epilepsy Unit | 0-21 |
| 24-bed | 7A | Acute Cardiac Unit | all ages (achd) |
| 23-bed | 7B | Abdominal Transplant, Renal, and Intestinal Care Unit | 0-21 |
| 25-bed | 7C | General Pediatric Unit | 0-21 |
| 12-bed | 7D | Children's Hospital Rehabilitation Unit (CHRU) | 0-25 |
| 24-bed | 8A | Neonatal Intensive Care Unit | Newborns |
| 23-bed | 8B | Pediatric medicine/Sleep lab | 0-21 |
| 31-bed | 8C | Neonatal Intensive Care Unit | Newborns |
| 24-bed | 9A | Adolescent & Endocrine Unit | 12-21 |
| 19-bed | 9B | Pediatric Hematology & Oncology and AYA | 0-25 |

In addition to the patient care units the hospital also has 14 operating rooms and 4 procedure rooms.

In addition, in 2023, UPMC Children's Hospital of Pittsburgh broke ground on a new Heart Institute at the Hospital that is set to open in 2026.

=== Research ===
In addition to the clinical services offered, CHP also has a wing for research at the new hospital campus. Research at CHP primarily takes place at the John G. Rangos Sr. Research Center. The building was built in 2008 and has nine floors and 300,000 square feet (28,000 m^{2}) of space. The center is named after philanthropist John G. Rangos after he donated $6 million cumulatively to the hospital.

The facility supports many different areas of research including fields such as biomedical research, including genomics, cellular imaging, signal transduction, structural biology, and immunology and neuroscience.

The building contains animal research laboratories, wet labs, general laboratory space, and offices to help find cures for pediatric ailments.

As part of the research center, Children's Hospital regularly conducts clinical trials to solve many of today's pediatric health challenges, including cancer, diabetes, heart disease, and liver and intestine transplantation.

=== Education ===
The hospital houses the pediatrics division of the University of Pittsburgh School of Medicine and attending physicians at the hospital are also professors at the school. The hospital's teaching program is home to 275 interns and residents at the university.

=== Ronald McDonald House ===
Ronald McDonald House Pittsburgh was originally started when Dr. Vincent Albo, a CHP oncologist, saw the need for a cheap place to stay for families of sick children being treated at CHP. After many donations, Ronald McDonald House Charities bought the mansion at 500 Shady Avenue and converted into a 10-room house. The house opened on July 10, 1979, making the house at Pittsburgh the seventh one to open in the country.

In 1994 an additional house opened in Pittsburgh adjacent to the first house. The new house came from a need for a place for families who needed to stay long-term or be isolated from the public, due to immunocompromised children.

On October 31, 2009, a new Ronald McDonald House opened on the site of CHP's Lawrenceville campus. The building used consists of apartment-style housing with 60 rooms, almost tripling the capacity of the previous houses. The building housing the house was built in 1982 by the U.S. Department of Housing and Urban Development as a home for senior citizens. While CHP owns the building, Ronald McDonald House and CHP have signed a 25-year lease for the building.

UPMC Children's Hospital of Pittsburgh is connected to the Ronald McDonald House via a third floor enclosed walkway, effectively within the same building.

== Awards ==
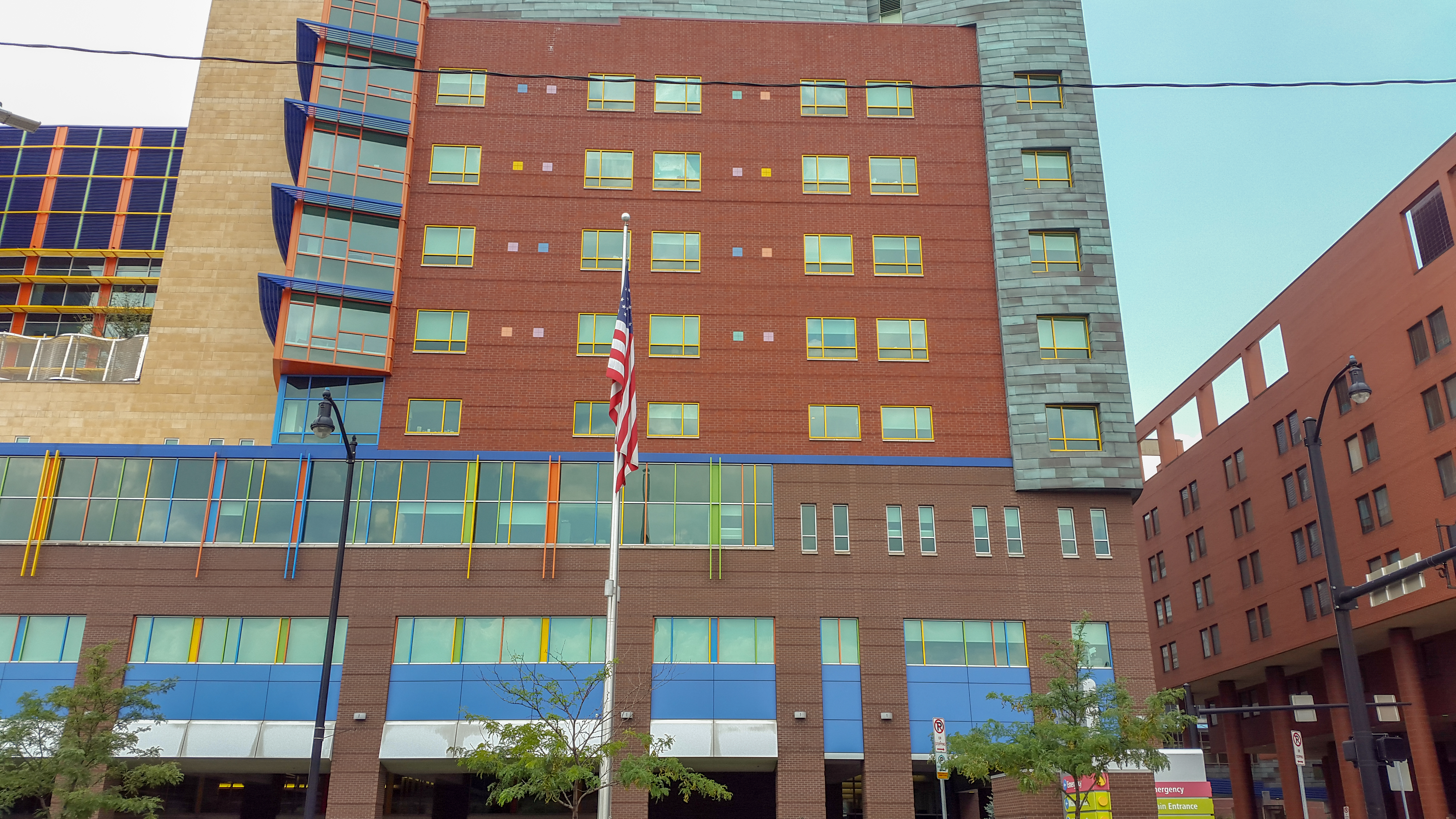
Front of the hospital

In 2008, Children's was ranked 10th among children's hospitals in funding provided by the National Institutes of Health.

In 2009, Children's was one of only eight pediatric hospitals in the nation named a 2009 Leapfrog Top Hospital by the Leapfrog Group. This was the second year in a row that Children's has been named a Leapfrog Top Hospital. The same year, CHP was recognized for leading the way in advanced technology as the first and today's only pediatric hospital in the United States to achieve Stage 7 recognition from HIMSS Analytics for the use and implementation of electronic medical records. Stage 7 is HIMSS' highest level of certification, achieved by only 0.5 percent of the more than 5,000 hospitals in the United States. Also, KLAS, an independent health care research organization, recognized CHP as the leader in its use of health care information technology among pediatric hospitals in the United States. This is only the third time in 12 years that KLAS has recognized a specific health care organization for the depth of adoption of electronic health records.

The new hospital was named the 7th most beautiful hospital in the US by Soliant Health in 2010 and the 10th most beautiful hospital in the world by HealthExecNews in 2012.

In 2015 CHP was named HIMSS Enterprise Davies Award recipient due to its advanced EHR system in place.

In 2020 the hospital was recognized by Human Rights Campaign Foundation as a "Top Performer" in their forward thinking LGBTQ policies and initiatives.

In 2024, UPMC Children's Hospital of Pittsburgh was named a 2024 Top Children's Hospital by Leapfrog Group.

== Rankings ==
As of 2025 the hospital was nationally ranked in all 11 specialties by U.S. News & World Report. The Hospital is also ranked #2 for Best Children's Hospitals in the State of Pennsylvania and #3 for Best Children's Hospitals in the Mid-Atlantic by U.S. News & World Reports

=== Pediatric specialty rankings ===
In 2010, UPMC Children's Hospital of Pittsburgh was one of only eight pediatric hospitals in the United States named to U.S. News & World Report's Best Children's Hospitals Honor Roll and was ranked in every specialty evaluated by US News.

In 2011, UPMC CHP was ranked as the 8th best children's hospital and ranked nationally in every specialty in the U.S. on the U.S. News & World Report Honor Roll.

In 2016, it was ranked as the 7th best children's hospital in America by U.S. News & World Report and was ranked 10th in neonatology, 22nd in cancer, 10th in cardiology, 3rd in diabetes, 2nd in gastroenterology and GI surgery, and 15th in nephrology, 10th in neurology, 44th in orthopedics, 6th in pulmonology, and 16th in urology.

As of 2022, UPMC Children's Hospital of Pittsburgh has placed nationally in all 10 ranked pediatric specialties on U.S. News & World

As of 2025, UPMC Children's Hospital of Pittsburgh was nationally ranked in all 11 ranked pediatric specialties, as well as #2 for Best Children's Hospitals in the State of Pennsylvania & #3 for Best Children's Hospitals in the Mid-Atlantic Region by U.S. News & World Reports

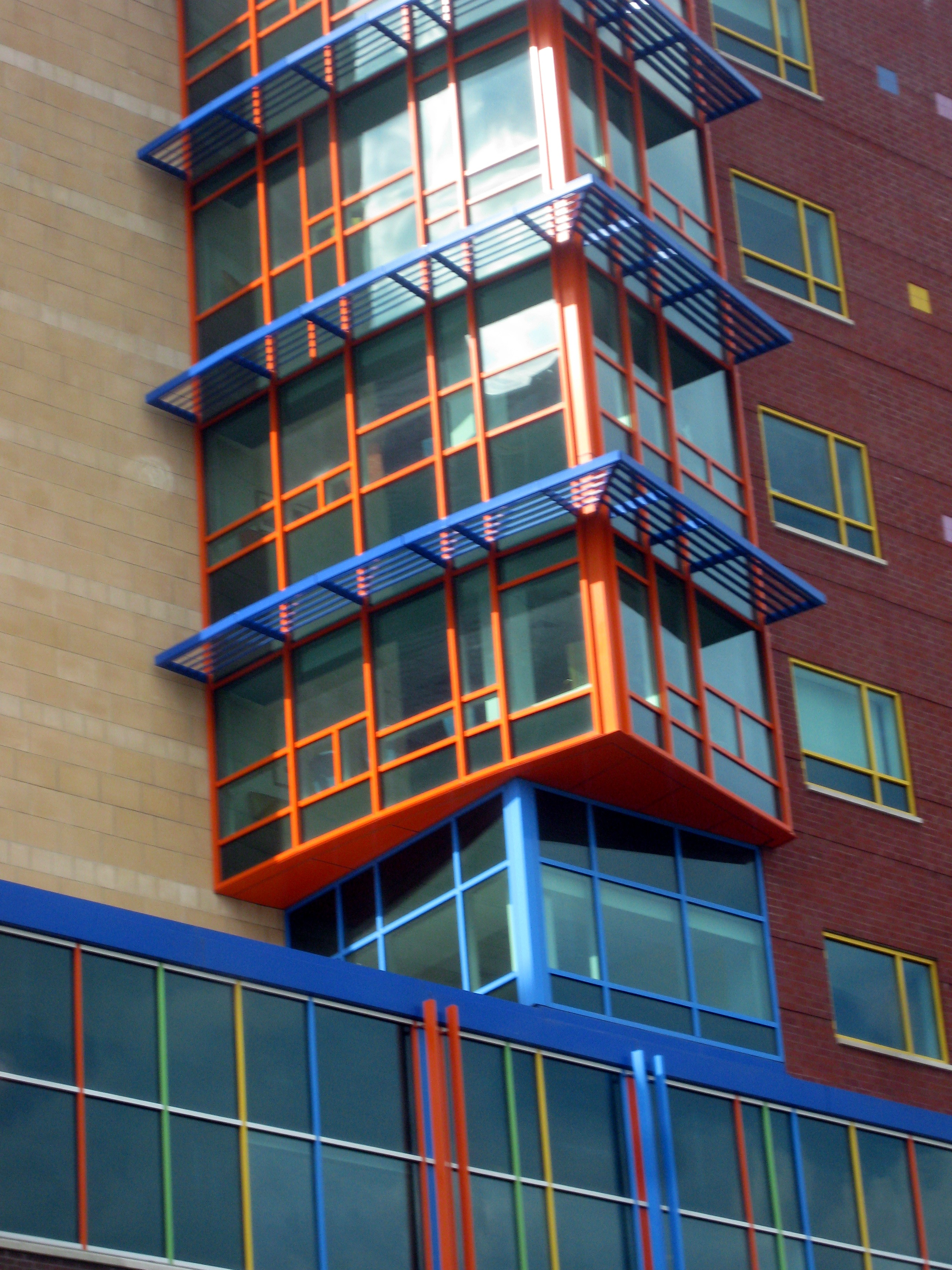
Detail of the exterior architecture of UPMC Children's Hospital of Pittsburgh

U.S. News & World Report Rankings for UPMC Children's Hospital of Pittsburgh
| Specialty | Rank (in the U.S.) | Score (out of 100) |
|---|---|---|
| Neonatology | 11 | 85.9 |
| Pediatric Adolescent & Behavioral Health | Top 50 | Top 50 |
| Pediatric Cancer | 14 | 87.1 |
| Pediatric Cardiology & Heart Surgery | 21 | 81.7 |
| Pediatric Diabetes & Endocrinology | 2 | 93 |
| Pediatric Gastroenterology & GI Surgery | 9 | 88 |
| Pediatric Nephrology | 12 | 86.7 |
| Pediatric Neurology & Neurosurgery | 15 | 88.3 |
| Pediatric Orthopedics | 35 | 75.9 |
| Pediatric Pulmonology & Lung Surgery | 5 | 90.8 |
| Pediatric Urology | 16 | 81.3 |

== Notable faculty ==
- Jonas Salk
- Thomas Starzl
- Benjamin Spock
- Jack Paradise

== See also ==
- List of children's hospitals in the United States
