= Green chemistry =

Research field in chemistry and chemical engineering

Green chemistry, similar to sustainable chemistry or circular chemistry, is an area of chemistry and chemical engineering focused on the design of products and processes that minimize or eliminate the use and generation of hazardous substances. While environmental chemistry focuses on the effects of polluting chemicals on nature, green chemistry focuses on the environmental impact of chemistry, including lowering consumption of nonrenewable resources and technological approaches for preventing pollution.

The overarching goals of green chemistry—namely, more resource-efficient and inherently safer design of molecules, materials, products, and processes—can be pursued in a wide range of contexts.

== Definition ==
Green chemistry (also called sustainable chemistry) is the design of chemical products and processes that reduce or eliminate the use and generation of hazardous substances. The concept integrates pollution-prevention and process-intensification approaches at laboratory and industrial scales to improve resource efficiency and minimize waste and risk across the life cycle of chemicals and materials.

== History ==
Green chemistry evolved and emerged from a variety of existing ideas and research efforts (such as Pollution Prevention, atom economy and catalysis) in the period leading up to the 1990s, in the context of increasing attention to problems of chemical pollution and resource depletion. The development of green chemistry in Europe and the United States was proceeded by a shift in environmental problem-solving strategies: a movement from command and control regulation and mandated lowering of industrial emissions at the "end of the pipe," toward the broad interdisciplinary concept of prevention of pollution through the innovative design of production technologies themselves. The narrower set of concepts later recognized and re-named as green chemistry coalesced in the mid- to late-1990s, along with broader adoption of the new term in the Academic literature (which prevailed over earlier competing terms such as "clean" and "sustainable" chemistry).

In the United States, the Environmental Protection Agency played a significant supporting role in evolving green chemistry out of its earlier pollution prevention programs, funding, and cooperative coordination with industry. At the same time in the United Kingdom, researchers at the University of York, who used the term "clean technology" in the early 1990s, contributed to the establishment of the Green Chemistry Network within the Royal Society of Chemistry, and the launch of the journal Green Chemistry. In 1991, in the Netherlands, a special issue called 'green chemistry' [groene chemie] was published in Chemisch Magazine. In the Dutch context, the umbrella term green chemistry was associated with the exploitation of biomass as a renewable feedstock.

== Principles ==
In 1998, Paul Anastas (who then directed the Green Chemistry Program at the US EPA), and John C. Warner (then of Polaroid Corporation), published a set of principles to guide the practice of green chemistry. The twelve principles address a range of ways to lower the environmental and health impacts of chemical production, and also indicate research priorities for the development of green chemistry technologies.

The principles cover such concepts as:

- the design of processes to maximize the amount of raw material that ends up in the product;
- the use of renewable material feedstocks and energy sources;
- the use of safe, environmentally benign substances, including solvents, whenever possible;
- the design of energy efficient processes;
- avoiding the production of waste, which is viewed as the ideal form of waste management.

The twelve principles of green chemistry are:

1. Prevention: Preventing waste is better than treating or cleaning up waste after it is created.
2. Atom economy: Synthetic methods should try to maximize the incorporation of all materials used in the process into the final product. This means that less waste will be generated as a result.
3. Less hazardous chemical syntheses: Synthetic methods should avoid using or generating substances toxic to humans and/or the environment.
4. Designing safer chemicals: Chemical products should be designed to achieve their desired function while being as non-toxic as possible.
5. Safer solvents and auxiliaries: Auxiliary substances should be avoided wherever possible, and as non-hazardous as possible when they must be used.
6. Design for energy efficiency: Energy requirements should be minimized, and processes should be conducted at ambient temperature and pressure whenever possible.
7. Use of renewable feedstocks: Whenever it is practical to do so, renewable feedstocks or raw materials are preferable to non-renewable ones.
8. Reduce derivatives: Unnecessary generation of derivatives—such as the use of protecting groups—should be minimized or avoided if possible; such steps require additional reagents and may generate additional waste.
9. Catalysis: Catalytic reagents that can be used in small quantities to repeat a reaction are superior to stoichiometric reagents (ones that are consumed in a reaction).
10. Design for degradation: Chemical products should be designed so that they do not pollute the environment; when their function is complete, they should break down into non-harmful products.
11. Real-time analysis for pollution prevention: Analytical methodologies need to be further developed to permit real-time, in-process monitoring and control before hazardous substances form.
12. Inherently safer chemistry for accident prevention: Whenever possible, the substances in a process, and the forms of those substances, should be chosen to minimize risks such as explosions, fires, and accidental releases.

== Trends ==
Attempts are being made not only to quantify the greenness of a chemical process but also to factor in other variables, such as chemical yield, the price of reaction components, safety in handling chemicals, hardware demands, energy profile and ease of product workup and purification. In one quantitative study, the reduction of nitrobenzene to aniline receives 64 points out of 100 marking it as an acceptable synthesis overall whereas a synthesis of an amide using HMDS is only described as adequate with a combined 32 points.

Green-chemistry methods are applied to the development and manufacture of nanomaterials, with attention to life-cycle impacts and potential nanotoxicity.

== Examples ==
=== Green solvents ===
The major application of solvents in human activities is in paints and coatings (46% of usage). Smaller volume applications include cleaning, de-greasing, adhesives, and in chemical synthesis. Traditional solvents are often toxic or are chlorinated. Green solvents, on the other hand, are generally less harmful to health and the environment and preferably more sustainable. Ideally, solvents would be derived from renewable resources and biodegrade to innocuous, products that occur often in nature. However, the manufacture of solvents from biomass can be more harmful to the environment than making the same solvents from fossil fuels. Thus the environmental impact of solvent manufacture must be considered when a solvent is being selected for a product or process.

Another factor to consider is the fate of the solvent after use. If the solvent is being used in an enclosed situation where solvent collection and recycling is feasible, then the energy cost and environmental harm associated with recycling should be considered; in such a situation, water, which is energy-intensive to purify, may not be the greenest choice. On the other hand, a solvent contained in a consumer product is likely to be released into the environment upon use, and therefore the environmental impact of the solvent itself is more important than the energy cost and impact of solvent recycling; in such a case, water is very likely to be a green choice. In short, the impact of the entire lifetime of the solvent, from cradle to grave (or cradle to cradle if recycled) must be considered. Thus the most comprehensive definition of a green solvent is the following: "a green solvent is the solvent that makes a product or process have the least environmental impact over its entire life cycle."

By definition, then, a solvent might be green for one application (because it results in less environmental harm than any other solvent that could be used for that application) and yet not be a green solvent for a different application. A classic example is water, which is a very green solvent for consumer products, such as toilet bowl cleaner, but is not a green solvent for the manufacture of polytetrafluoroethylene. For the production of that polymer, the use of water as solvent requires the addition of perfluorinated surfactants which are highly persistent. Instead, supercritical carbon dioxide seems to be the greenest solvent for that application because it performs well without any surfactant. In summary, no solvent can be declared to be a "green solvent" unless the declaration is limited to a specific application.

=== Synthetic techniques ===
Novel or enhanced synthetic techniques can often provide improved environmental performance or enable better adherence to the principles of green chemistry. For example, the 2005 Nobel Prize for Chemistry was awarded to Yves Chauvin, Robert H. Grubbs and Richard R. Schrock, for the development of the metathesis method in organic synthesis, with explicit reference to its contribution to green chemistry and "smarter production." A 2005 review identified three key developments in green chemistry in the field of organic synthesis: use of supercritical carbon dioxide as green solvent, aqueous hydrogen peroxide for clean oxidations and the use of hydrogen in asymmetric synthesis. Some further examples of applied green chemistry are supercritical water oxidation, on water reactions, and dry media reactions.

Bioengineering is also seen as a promising technique for achieving green chemistry goals. A number of important process chemicals can be synthesized in engineered organisms, such as shikimate, a Tamiflu precursor which is fermented by Roche in bacteria. Click chemistry is often cited as a style of chemical synthesis that is consistent with the goals of green chemistry. The concept of 'green pharmacy' has recently been articulated based on similar principles.

=== Carbon dioxide as blowing agent ===
In 1996, Dow Chemical won the 1996 Greener Reaction Conditions award for their 100% carbon dioxide blowing agent for polystyrene foam production. Polystyrene foam is a common material used in packing and food transportation. Seven hundred million pounds are produced each year in the United States alone. Traditionally, CFC and other ozone-depleting chemicals were used in the production process of the foam sheets, presenting a serious environmental hazard. Flammable, explosive, and, in some cases toxic hydrocarbons have also been used as CFC replacements, but they present their own problems. Dow Chemical discovered that supercritical carbon dioxide works equally as well as a blowing agent, without the need for hazardous substances, allowing the polystyrene to be more easily recycled. The CO_{2} used in the process is reused from other industries, so the net carbon released from the process is zero.

=== Hydrazine ===
Addressing the second principle is the peroxide process for producing hydrazine without cogenerating salt. Hydrazine is traditionally produced by the Olin Raschig process from sodium hypochlorite (the active ingredient in many bleaches) and ammonia. The net reaction produces one equivalent of sodium chloride for every equivalent of the targeted product hydrazine:

NaOCl + 2 NH_{3} → H_{2}N-NH_{2} + NaCl + H_{2}O

In the greener peroxide process, hydrogen peroxide is employed as the oxidant and the side product is water. The net conversion follows:

2 NH_{3} + H_{2}O_{2} → H_{2}N-NH_{2} + 2 H_{2}O

Addressing the fourth principle, this process does not require auxiliary extracting solvents. Methyl ethyl ketone is used as a carrier for the hydrazine, the intermediate ketazine phase separates from the reaction mixture, facilitating workup without the need of an extracting solvent.

=== 1,3-Propanediol ===
Addressing the seventh principle is a green route to 1,3-propanediol, which is traditionally generated from petrochemical precursors. It can be produced from renewable precursors via the bioseparation of 1,3-propanediol using a genetically modified strain of E. coli. This diol is used to make new polyesters for the manufacture of carpets.

=== Lactide ===
Lactide

In 2002, Cargill Dow (now NatureWorks) won the Greener Reaction Conditions Award for their improved method for polymerization of polylactic acid. However, lactide-base polymers do not perform well and the project was discontinued by Dow in 2005. Lactic acid is produced by fermenting corn, and then lactide, the cyclic dimer ester of lactic acid, is produced using an efficient, tin-catalyzed cyclization.

The L,L-lactide enantiomer is isolated by distillation and polymerized in the melt to make a crystallizable polymer, which has some applications including textiles and apparel, cutlery, and food packaging. The NatureWorks PLA process substitutes renewable materials for petroleum feedstocks, doesn't require the use of hazardous organic solvents typical in other PLA processes, and results in a high-quality polymer that is recyclable and compostable.

=== Carpet tile backings ===
In 2003, Shaw Industries selected a combination of polyolefin resins as the base polymer of choice for EcoWorx due to the low toxicity of its feedstocks, superior adhesion properties, dimensional stability, and its ability to be recycled. The EcoWorx compound also had to be designed to be compatible with nylon carpet fiber. Although EcoWorx may be recovered from any fiber type, nylon-6 provides a significant advantage. Polyolefins are compatible with known nylon-6 depolymerization methods. PVC interferes with those processes.

Nylon-6 chemistry is well-known and not addressed in first-generation production. From its inception, EcoWorx met all of the design criteria necessary to satisfy the needs of the marketplace from a performance, health, and environmental standpoint. Research indicated that separation of the fiber and backing through elutriation, grinding, and air separation proved to be the best way to recover the face and backing components, but an infrastructure for returning postconsumer EcoWorx to the elutriation process was necessary.

Research also indicated that the postconsumer carpet tile had a positive economic value at the end of its useful life. EcoWorx is recognized by MBDC as a certified cradle-to-cradle design.

=== Transesterification of fats ===
Trans and cis fatty acids

In 2005, Archer Daniels Midland (ADM) and Novozymes won the Greener Synthetic Pathways Award for their enzyme interesterification process. In response to the U.S. Food and Drug Administration (FDA) mandated labeling of trans-fats on nutritional information by January 1, 2006, Novozymes and ADM worked together to develop a clean, enzymatic process for the interesterification of oils and fats by interchanging saturated and unsaturated fatty acids.

The result is commercially viable products without trans-fats. In addition to the human health benefits of eliminating trans-fats, the process has reduced the use of toxic chemicals and water, prevents vast amounts of byproducts, and reduces the amount of fats and oils wasted.

=== Bio-succinic acid ===
In 2011, the Outstanding Green Chemistry Accomplishments by a Small Business Award went to BioAmber Inc. for integrated production and downstream applications of bio-based succinic acid. Succinic acid is a platform chemical that is an important starting material in the formulations of everyday products. Traditionally, succinic acid is produced from petroleum-based feedstocks. Bio Amber has developed process and technology that produces succinic acid from the fermentation of renewable feedstocks at a lower cost and lower energy expenditure than the petroleum equivalent while sequestering CO_{2} rather than emitting it. However, lower prices of oil precipitated the company into bankruptcy, and bio-sourced succinic acid is now rarely made.

=== Laboratory chemicals ===
Several laboratory chemicals are controversial from the perspective of Green chemistry. The Massachusetts Institute of Technology created a "Green" Alternatives Wizard to help identify alternatives. Ethidium bromide, xylene, mercury, and formaldehyde have been identified as "worst offenders" which have alternatives. Solvents in particular make a large contribution to the environmental impact of chemical manufacturing and there is a growing focus on introducing Greener solvents into the earliest stage of development of these processes: laboratory-scale reaction and purification methods. In the Pharmaceutical Industry, both GSK and Pfizer have published Solvent Selection Guides for their Drug Discovery chemists.

== Legislation ==
=== The EU ===
In 2007, The EU put into place the Registration, Evaluation, Authorisation and Restriction of Chemicals (REACH) program, which requires companies to provide data showing that their products are safe. This regulation (1907/2006) ensures not only the assessment of the chemicals' hazards as well as risks during their uses but also includes measures for banning or restricting/authorizing uses of specific substances. ECHA, the EU Chemicals Agency in Helsinki, is implementing the regulation, whereas the enforcement lies with the EU member states.

=== United States ===
The United States formed the Environmental Protection Agency (EPA) in 1970 to protect human and environmental health by creating and enforcing environmental regulation. Green chemistry builds on the EPA's goals by encouraging chemists and engineers to design chemicals, processes, and products that avoid the creation of toxins and waste.

The U.S. law that governs the majority of industrial chemicals (excluding pesticides, foods, and pharmaceuticals) is the Toxic Substances Control Act (TSCA) of 1976. Examining the role of regulatory programs in shaping the development of green chemistry in the United States, analysts have revealed structural flaws and long-standing weaknesses in TSCA; for example, a 2006 report to the California Legislature concludes that TSCA has produced a domestic chemicals market that discounts the hazardous properties of chemicals relative to their function, price, and performance. Scholars have argued that such market conditions represent a key barrier to the scientific, technical, and commercial success of green chemistry in the U.S., and fundamental policy changes are needed to correct these weaknesses.

Passed in 1990, the Pollution Prevention Act helped foster new approaches for dealing with pollution by preventing environmental problems before they happen.

Green chemistry grew in popularity in the United States after the Pollution Prevention Act of 1990 was passed. This Act declared that pollution should be lowered by improving designs and products rather than treatment and disposal. These regulations encouraged chemists to reimagine pollution and research ways to limit the toxins in the atmosphere. In 1991, the EPA Office of Pollution Prevention and Toxics created a research grant program encouraging the research and recreation of chemical products and processes to limit the impact on the environment and human health. The EPA hosts The Green Chemistry Challenge each year to incentivize the economic and environmental benefits of developing and utilizing green chemistry.

In 2008, the State of California approved two laws aiming to encourage green chemistry, launching the California Green Chemistry Initiative. One of these statutes required California's Department of Toxic Substances Control (DTSC) to develop new regulations to prioritize "chemicals of concern" and promote the substitution of hazardous chemicals with safer alternatives. The resulting regulations took effect in 2013, initiating DTSC's Safer Consumer Products Program.

== Scientific journals specialized in green chemistry ==
- Green Chemistry (RSC)
- Green Chemistry Letters and Reviews (Open Access) (Taylor & Francis)
- ChemSusChem (Wiley)
- ACS Sustainable Chemistry & Engineering (ACS)

== Contested definition ==
There are ambiguities in the definition of green chemistry and how it is understood among broader science, policy, and business communities. Even within chemistry, researchers have used the term "green chemistry" to describe a range of work independently of the framework put forward by Anastas and Warner (i.e., the 12 principles). While not all uses of the term are legitimate (see greenwashing), many are, and the authoritative status of any single definition is uncertain. More broadly, the idea of green chemistry can easily be linked (or confused) with related concepts like green engineering, environmental design, or sustainability in general. Green chemistry's complexity and multifaceted nature makes it difficult to devise clear and simple metrics. As a result, "what is green" is often open to debate.

== Awards ==
Several scientific societies have created awards to encourage research in green chemistry.

- Australia's Green Chemistry Challenge Awards overseen by The Royal Australian Chemical Institute (RACI).
- The Canadian Green Chemistry Medal.
- In Italy, Green Chemistry activities center around an inter-university consortium known as INCA.
- In Japan, The Green & Sustainable Chemistry Network oversees the GSC awards program.
- In the United Kingdom, the Green Chemical Technology Awards are given by Crystal Faraday.
- In the US, the Presidential Green Chemistry Challenge Awards recognize individuals and businesses.

== See also ==
- Bioremediation – a technique that generally falls outside the scope of green chemistry
- Environmental engineering science
- Green Chemistry (journal) – published by the Royal Society of Chemistry
- Green chemistry metrics
- Green computing – a similar initiative in the area of computing
- Green engineering
- Substitution of dangerous chemicals
- Sustainable engineering
