= Roger A. Sheldon =

British chemist (born 1942)

Roger Sheldon FRS FRSC
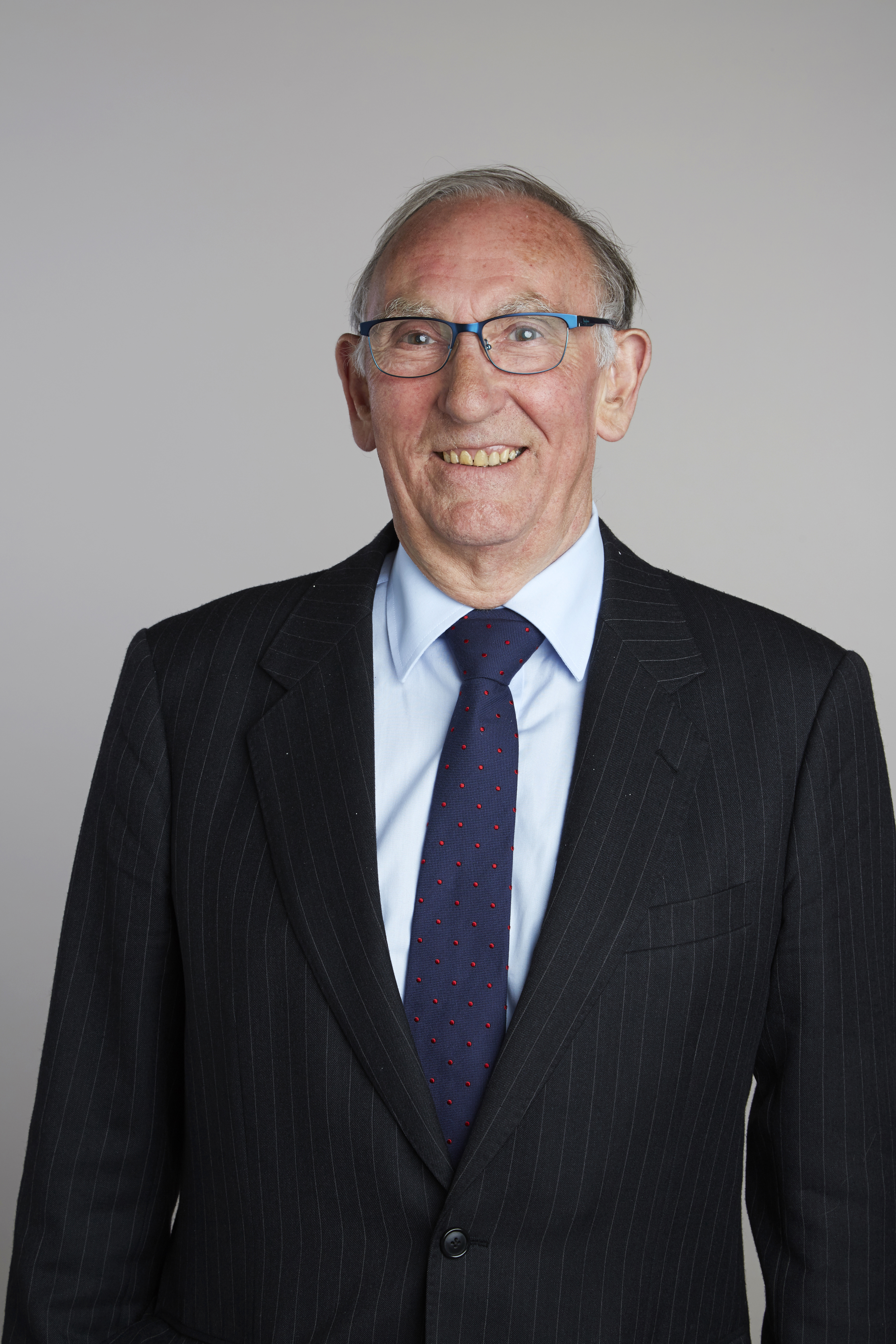
- Sheldon in 2015
- Born: Roger Arthur Sheldon; 24 June 1942; Nottingham, England, UK
- Died: 6 October 2025 (aged 83)
- Education: University of Leicester
- Known for: Atom economy; Green chemistry metrics
- Spouse: Janna Kornelia Dijkstra
- Awards: Green Chemistry Award (2010)
- Scientific career
- Fields: Biocatalysis; Green chemistry; Catalytic oxidation
- Workplaces: Delft University of Technology; Case Western Reserve University; Indiana University; Boots Pure Drug Company Ltd.; Royal Dutch Shell
- Thesis: Some reactions of tetraphenyldiphosphine (1967)
- Doctoral advisor: Stuart Trippett; Stephen Davidson
- Website: sheldon.nl

Roger Arthur Sheldon (24 June 1942 – 6 October 2025) was a British chemist. He was emeritus professor of Biocatalysis and Organic Chemistry at Delft University of Technology in the Netherlands.

== Education ==
Sheldon was educated at the University of Leicester where he was awarded a PhD in 1967 for research on the chemical reactions of the tetraphenyldiphosphine. supervised by Stuart Trippett and Stephen Davidson.

== Career and research ==
Sheldon was distinguished for his pioneering and wide-ranging contributions to catalytic oxidation, biocatalysis and green chemistry and for bridging the traditional gap between organic synthesis and catalysis. He introduced the concept of the E-factor which is now used by companies globally for assessing the efficiency and environmental impact of chemical processes. He consistently emphasised the need for a new paradigm in the evaluation of efficiency in chemical processes from the traditional concept of chemical yield to one that assigns value to waste minimisation and was an avid proponent of elegance and precision in organic synthesis.

=== Awards and honours ===
Sheldon was elected a Fellow of the Royal Society (FRS) in 2015 and a Fellow of the Royal Society of Chemistry (FRSC) in 1980. He was awarded the Green Chemistry Award by the Royal Society of Chemistry in 2010, and made an Honorary Fellow of the same society in 2018.
