= Atom economy =

Measure of reaction efficiency

Atom economy

Atom economy (atom efficiency/percentage) is the conversion efficiency of a chemical process in terms of all atoms involved and the desired products produced. The simplest definition was introduced by Barry Trost in 1991 and is equal to the ratio between the molar mass of desired product to the total molar mass of reactants, expressed as a percentage. The concept of atom economy (AE) and the idea of making it a primary criterion for improvement in chemistry, is a part of the green chemistry movement that was championed by Paul Anastas from the early 1990s. Atom economy is an important concept of green chemistry philosophy, and one of the most widely used metrics for measuring the "greenness" of a process or synthesis.

Good atom economy means most of the atoms of the reactants are incorporated in the desired products and only small amounts of unwanted byproducts are formed, reducing the economic and environmental impact of waste disposal.

Atom economy can be written as:
$$\text{atom economy} =
\frac{\text{molecular weight of desired product}}{\text{molecular weight of all reactants}} \times 100\%$$

For example, if we consider the reaction
$$A + B \rightarrow C + D,$$
where C is the desired product, then
$$\text{atom economy} = \frac{\text{Molecular weight }C}{\text{Molecular weight of }A  + B} \%$$

Optimal atom economy is 100%.

Atom economy is a different concern than chemical yield, because a high-yielding process can still result in substantial byproducts. Examples include the Cannizzaro reaction, in which approximately 50% of the reactant aldehyde becomes the other oxidation state of the target; the Wittig and Suzuki reactions which use high-mass reagents that ultimately become waste; and the Gabriel synthesis, which produces a stoichiometric quantity of phthalic acid salts.

If the desired product has an enantiomer the reaction needs to be sufficiently stereoselective even when atom economy is 100%. A Diels–Alder reaction is an example of a potentially very atom efficient reaction that also can be chemo-, regio-, diastereo- and enantioselective. Catalytic hydrogenation comes the closest to being an ideal reaction that is extensively practiced both industrially and academically.

Atom economy can also be adjusted if a pendant group is recoverable, for example Evans auxiliary groups. However, if this can be avoided it is more desirable, as recovery processes will never be 100%. Atom economy can be improved upon by careful selection of starting materials and a catalyst system.

Poor atom economy is common in fine chemicals or pharmaceuticals synthesis, and especially in research, where the aim to readily and reliably produce a wide range of complex compounds leads to the use of versatile and dependable, but poorly atom-economical reactions. For example, synthesis of an alcohol is readily accomplished by reduction of an ester with lithium aluminium hydride, but the reaction necessarily produces a voluminous floc of aluminum salts, which have to be separated from the product alcohol and disposed of. The cost of such hazardous material disposal can be considerable. Catalytic hydrogenolysis of an ester is the analogous reaction with a high atom economy, but it requires catalyst optimization, is a much slower reaction and is not applicable universally.

== Creating reactions utilizing atom economy ==
It is fundamental in chemical reactions of the form A+B→ C+D that two products are necessarily generated though product C may have been the desired one. That being the case, D is considered a byproduct. As it is a significant goal of green chemistry to maximize the efficiency of the reactants and minimize the production of waste, D must either be found to have use, be eliminated or be as insignificant and innocuous as possible. With the new equation of the form A+B→C, the first step in making chemical manufacturing more efficient is the use of reactions that resemble simple addition reactions with the only other additions being catalytic materials.
