= On-water reaction =

On-water reactions are a group of organic reactions that take place as an emulsion in water and have an unusual reaction rate acceleration compared with (i) the same reaction in an organic solvent, or (ii) the corresponding dry media reaction. This effect has been known for many years but in 2005 researchers in the group of K. Barry Sharpless published a systematic study into this phenomenon.

The rate acceleration is found in certain Claisen rearrangements. In one typical example of this reaction at room temperature the chemical yield was found to be 100% on water after 120 h compared with 16% for the same reaction in toluene and 73% in the neat reaction.

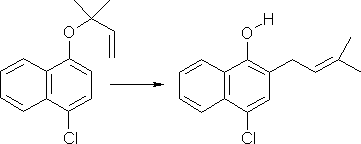

Enhanced reactivity is also found in cycloadditions. The reaction of quadricyclane with DEAD is a 2σ + 2σ + 2π cycloaddition that on water takes place within 10 minutes at room temperature with 82% yield. The same reaction in toluene takes 24 hours at 80 °C with 70% yield. An emulsion reaction in fluorinated cyclohexane takes 36 hours and the neat reaction takes even longer (48 hours).

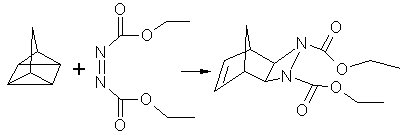

Other reactions with apolar reactants such as Ene reactions and Diels–Alder reactions also exhibit rate accelerations. An explanation is not available but it involves hydrogen bonding and the presence of a small amount of dissolved solute. This reaction type is of interest to green chemistry because it greatly reduces the usage of organic solvents, reaction product isolation is relatively easy, and it increases the yields and chemical purity with little extra expenditure, if not less.

== Examples ==
In one study a coupling reaction between an indole and a quinone takes place at room temperature without catalyst in water in 82% chemical yield even though reactants and products are insoluble in this medium. The reaction is much less efficient in homogeneous systems such as dichloromethane, toluene and acetonitrile or even the solvent free reaction or even the water reaction but now at 50 °C.

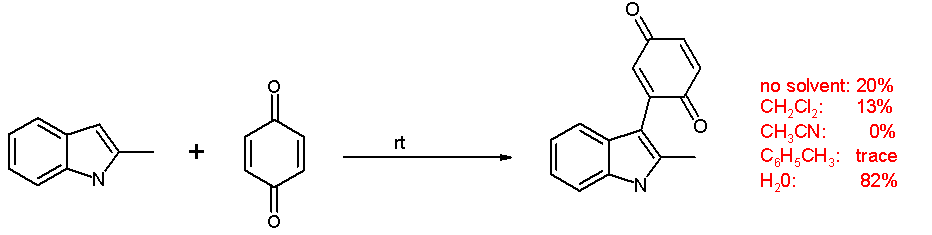

The on water effect is also studied in cycloadditions of the type:

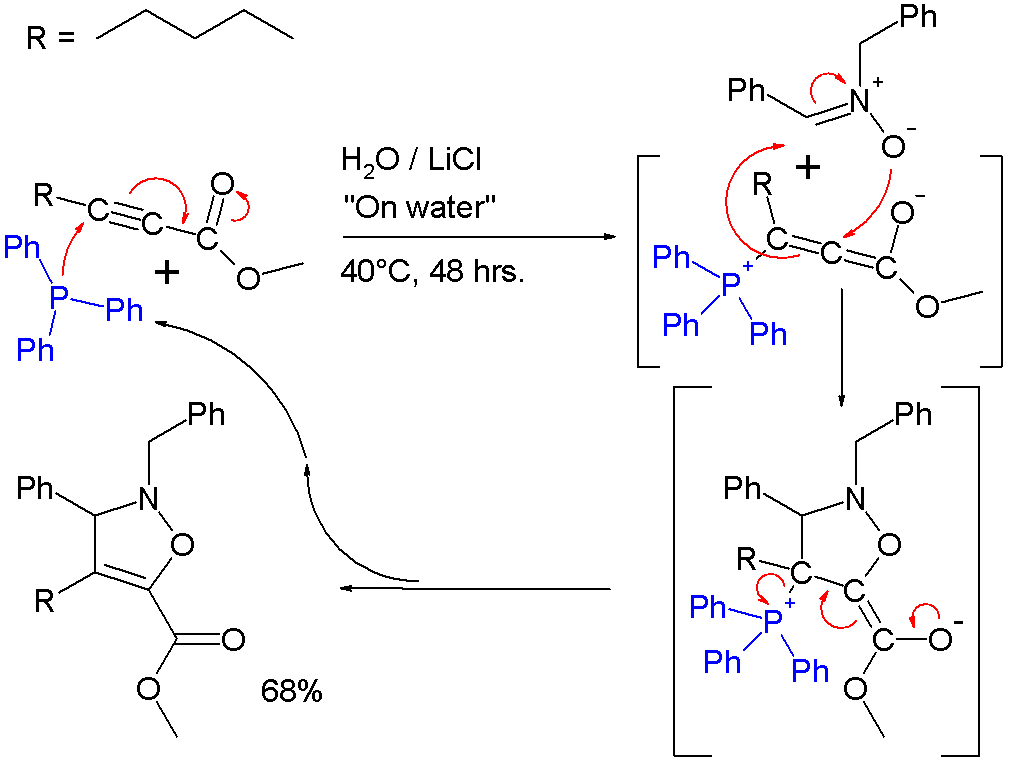

In this reaction the alkyne methyl 2-octynoate reacts with triphenylphosphine to an intermediate zwitterionic allenolate, a dipolarophile for the 1,3-dipole 2-phenylnitrone. The primary regioselective [3+2]dipolar cycloaddition product then rearranges to a dihydroisoxazole with regeneration of the phosphine. This reaction only takes place in water with lithium chloride added even though the reactants do not dissolve in this medium. In organic solvents such as toluene or dichloromethane no reaction takes place.

== Reaction in presence of water ==
An alternative classification with broader scope is suggested by Yujiro Hayashi as he describes certain organocatalytic Aldol reactions as taking place in the presence of water. The observed effect in these reactions is not rate acceleration (that would be on water), but an increase in enantioselectivity.

In the context of organocatalysis, both concepts of on-water reactions and in-the-presence-of-water reactions were criticized in 2007 as not so environmentally friendly by Donna Blackmond. According to Blackmond, separation of reaction product from the water phase usually requires organic solvent anyway, and in reported aqueous systems the water phase can in reality be less than 10% of the total reaction mixture with another component forming the actual solvent. Blackmond also notes that in reported instances, the observed rate-acceleration in presence of water is due to water suppressing reaction deactivation.
