= RME =

RME may refer to:

== Science and technology ==
- Rapeseed Methyl Ester, a form of biodiesel
- Receptor-mediated endocytosis, a biological process
- Rich Media Environment, an Open Mobile Alliance standard for broadcasting multimedia content
- Reaction mass efficiency, a metric to rate chemical reactions
- RME-6 or GAPVD1, a protein encoded by the GAPVD1 gene

== Transport ==
- Ronsdorf-Müngstener Eisenbahn or Ronsdorf-Müngsten Railway, North Rhine-Westphalia, Germany; see Wuppertal-Ronsdorf station
- IATA Airport Code for Griffiss International Airport in Rome, New York

== Other uses ==
- River Music Experience, in Davenport, Iowa
- ISO 639:rme, Angloromani language, spoken by the Romani people
- Rme, known as Qiang language, a Sino-Tibetan language cluster
