= Avtar Matharu =

British scientist and equality activist

Avtar Singh Matharu, MBE, is a Professor of Chemistry and Deputy Head of Department at the University of York in England. His research interests include green and sustainable chemistry with a particular focus on the valorisation of renewable resources using green technologies. He developed Matharu Plots which analyse geographical biases when citing academic literature.

== Early life and education ==
Matharu was born in Nairobi and then raised in Leicester from the age of 6. His PhD studies were in the synthesis of Liquid Crystals and later developed methods to recycle LCD waste. In 2021, he became the first turban-wearing Professor of Sikh heritage at the University of York.

== Research ==
Matharu's research span many aspects of Green Chemistry including the valoration of waste and low-value resources, biofuels, green solvents, and green synthesis. As of 2026, Google Scholar reported Matharu's H-index as 46 and is an author of over 190 research publications. Since 2019, he has been Editor in Chief for the Elsevier journal, Current Research in Green and Sustainable Chemistry. Prior to his role as Deputy Head of Department, he was Deputy Director of the Green Chemistry Center for Excellence (GCCE) at the University of York.

== Anti-racism and community work ==
Matharu is also well known for his work challenging racism and racist barriers in STEM and academia, and promoting interfaith community partnerships, for which he was awarded an MBE. He is Chair of the York Indian Cultural Association, former Chair and current treasurer of the York Interfaith Group which aims to promote mutual respect and understanding between faith communities. He has also been co-chair of the University of York Race Equality Forum.

== STEM Education ==
He was a recipient of the 2026 RSC Horizon for Education prize for "For championing decolonisation of the undergraduate chemistry curriculum, through widespread dissemination of strategies and resources to promote more inclusive chemistry teaching". He has served as an external examiner for Keele University. He lead a work stream of the Yorkshire Consortium for Equity in Doctorial Education (YCEDE) £4 million funded project to improve access and participation of Black, Asian and minority ethnic people to postgraduate education in Yorkshire.

=== Matharu Plots ===
A Matharu plot is an infographic used to visualise the geographic regions where the research described in academic reports and articles took place. The plots are used as a tool for decolonising academic writing, and have been introduced to undergraduate and postgraduate chemistry courses at the University of York.

== Awards ==
- 2026 New Year Honors Member of the British Empire (MBE)
- 2025 Royal Society of Chemistry Horizon Prize
