= John Warner (chemist) =

American green chemist

John C. Warner
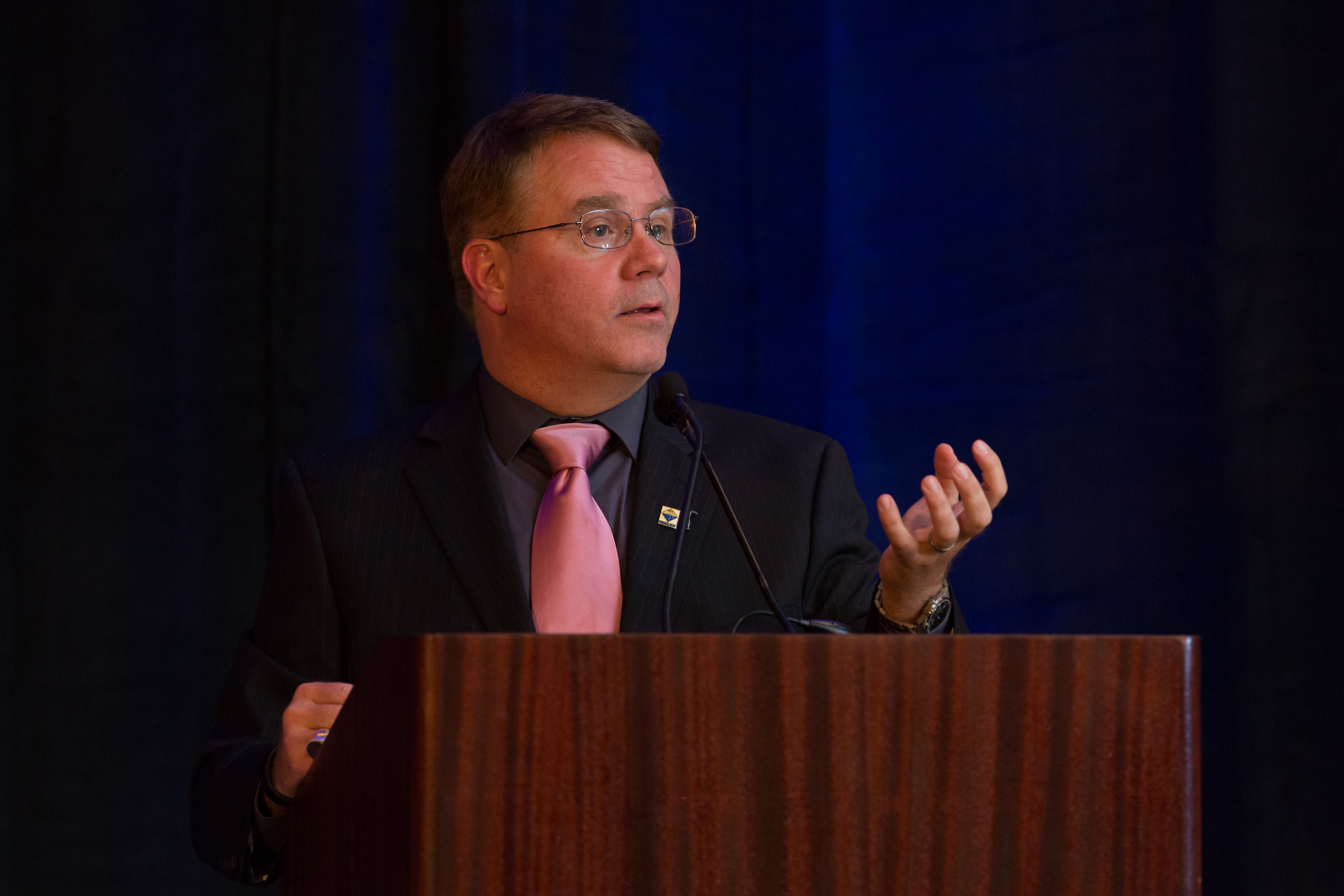
- Born: October 25, 1962 (age 63); Quincy, Massachusetts, U.S.
- Education: University of Massachusetts, Boston, Princeton University
- Awards: Perkin Medal
- Scientific career
- Fields: Green chemistry
- Workplaces: Warner-Babcock Institute for Green Chemistry, Beyond Benign, University of Massachusetts, Polaroid Corporation
- Website: Official website

John Charles Warner (born October 25, 1962) is an American chemist, educator, and entrepreneur, best known as one of the founders of the field of green chemistry. Warner worked in industry for nearly a decade as a researcher at Polaroid Corporation, before moving to academia where he worked in various positions at University of Massachusetts Boston and Lowell. Warner is co-founder, President, and Chief Technology Officer at the Warner-Babcock Institute for Green Chemistry, as well as co-founder and President of Beyond Benign. He is the recipient of the 2014 Perkin Medal, widely acknowledged as the highest honor in American industrial chemistry.

== Education ==
Warner was born in Quincy, Massachusetts, to John A. and Natalie Warner as part of a huge family, including 47 first cousins within a one-mile radius. During his childhood, Warner first met his long-time friend and colleague Paul Anastas at age eleven, with whom he later co-authored the defining work in the developing field, Green Chemistry: Theory and Practice.

Anastas and Warner both attended Quincy High School, where Warner was most well known, not as a chemist, but as a musician. There, he played in the marching band and the jazz band, and was voted class musician. No one in Warner's family at the time had attended university, and most of them worked as tradespeople, but Warner ultimately decided to attend University of Massachusetts Boston, where Anastas also matriculated, as a music major. Warner worked in construction full-time to pay his own tuition throughout college. He played in a successful band called the Elements until the death of drummer James "Opie" Neil, at which point Warner became more much involved in his then-elective chemistry classes. He began doing research in the laboratory of Jean-Pierre Anselme, where Anastas also worked, and this ultimately inspired him to switch majors. He published five papers as an undergraduate by the time he was twenty years old. Warner graduated alongside Anastas, receiving his B.S. in chemistry in 1984.

After college, Warner pursued graduate studies at Princeton University, where he received a PhD in chemistry after completing a doctoral dissertation, titled "Synthesis of pyrido[2,3-d]pyrimidines (5-deazapteridines)", under the supervision of Edward C. Taylor. His group helped synthesize pemetrexed (brand name Alimta), one of the most powerful anti-cancer drugs for solid tumors.

== Career ==
Warner was offered a job immediately after graduate school in research and development at Polaroid Corporation, where he worked for almost a decade. During this time, Warner first conceived a theory called Non-Covalent Derivatization, a unique approach to chemical synthesis that involves changing the properties of a target material by exploiting its innate intermolecular forces. It was also while working for Polaroid that Warner was reunited with childhood and undergraduate friend Paul Anastas, then employed at the Environmental Protection Agency, at a meeting that inspired Warner to co-author his most influential work Green Chemistry: Theory and Practice with Anastas.

In 1996, Warner returned to academia to work at University of Massachusetts Boston, where he served as tenured full professor as well as chair of the department of chemistry from 2001 to 2003. It was also there that he established the world's first PhD program in Green Chemistry. Amy Cannon, whom he later married, was the program's first graduate and the first person to receive a PhD in the field of Green Chemistry. He then moved to University of Massachusetts Lowell, where he established and directed the Center for Green Chemistry from 2004 to 2007.

Warner left Lowell in 2007 to co-found, with investment firm executive Jim Babcock, the Warner-Babcock Institute for Green Chemistry, and, with his wife Amy Cannon, Beyond Benign, a nonprofit organization for green chemistry education.

Committed to educating the public on green chemistry, Warner has spoken as keynote and plenary speaker for numerous green chemistry and sustainability conferences. Aside from awards for his work in the field, he was selected (with Anastas) as a "Top 40 Power Player" by ICIS in 2008, and as an Utne Reader "visionary" in 2011.

Warner has invented technologies for companies including Nike, Givaudan, Covestro, Lanxess, and Entegris, as serving on advisory boards for companies including Dow, Nike, Levis, and Apple. In 2022, he took up the role of Distinguished Research Fellow at DUDE CHEM, Berlin and as Green Chemistry Innovation Advisor at GL Chemtec, Ontario. In 2024, Warner was appointed professor of practice at the Rochester Institute of Technology (RIT).

== Non-Covalent Derivatization ==
Warner first articulated the concept of Non-Covalent Derivatization (NCD) at a conference in 1997, but he employed this concept in practice as early as 1988. He initially devised this method as a solution to a common engineering problem that hydroquinone (HQ), an essential developer in Polaroid instant photography, is not readily soluble in water. HQ is desired in more modern applications for its potency as a reducing agent, and until Warner, this problem was typically addressed by traditional chemical synthesis, or modifying a target material by attaching various functional groups via covalent bonds, also referred to as "covalent derivatization." Inspired by phenomena he observed in nature, Warner proposed NCD as an alternative means of modifying a target material, not via covalent bonds, but innate intermolecular forces.

In the model example of hydroquinone, Warner devised a novel process of co-crystallization between HQ and a terephthalamide molecule, which yielded a product complex that was much more soluble in water than HQ alone. The applications of this process ranged from film development to more recently cosmetic dermatology. NCD is now most often employed as an effective means of reducing the environmental impact of a process, by the minimizing the materials and energy required and waste produced, and is successfully applied in the production of pharmaceuticals as well as fragrances, agrochemicals, pigments, and food additives. Warner holds patents based on NCD in many of these areas, most notably drugs to treat nervous system disorders, additives to increase recyclability of asphalt, and processes to reverse depigmentation in hair.

NCD was also the impetus for a consequential meeting between Warner and the Environmental Protection Agency (EPA), after the agency rejected a manufacturing model proposed by Polaroid based on the method. It was there that Warner was reunited with his long-time friend Paul Anastas, and the two began to formulate the Twelve Principles of Green Chemistry.

Warner became so infatuated with Non-Covalent Derivatization that his Massachusetts license plate bears the initials NCD.

== Green Chemistry: Theory and Practice ==
The seminal work Green Chemistry: Theory and Practice was first conceived in a meeting at the Environmental Protection Agency (EPA) about Non-Covalent Derivatization (NCD). When a new manufacturing model for instant photography based on NCD of hydroquinone was rejected by the EPA, Polaroid sent Warner to give a seminar on this new method. It was there that he met the branch chief at the Office of Pollution Prevention and Toxics, none other than his childhood and undergraduate friend Paul Anastas.

The introduction of the book highlights that many environmental crises in the twentieth century, from those depicted in Rachel Carson's influential Silent Spring to the more recent events at Times Beach and Love Canal, stemmed from the poor practice of traditional industrial chemistry. As the environmental movement grew, the chemical industry was portrayed as the clear antagonist. Anastas and Warner argue that in the past, the role of the chemist in the environment was limited to site monitoring and remediation after an accident, but in a present where so many new chemicals are constantly introduced, it is now imperative that chemists assure that anything created is non-toxic, before it is even synthesized.

One of the most influential sections of the book outlines the Twelve Principles of Green Chemistry, which have served as the foundation for green chemistry curricula and the blueprint for chemical industry practice throughout the world. The remainder of the book details how to design environmentally benign chemicals, from evaluating starting materials to examining concrete toxicological mechanisms and giving examples of green processes.

Green Chemistry: Theory and Practice did not invent the term green chemistry, which was coined in the early 1990s, but it was notable because it helped to define the motives and a common mission in the developing field. Within a few years after the book was released, the number of papers and patents published that included the term green chemistry increased steadily. As of 2015, the book has been translated in fifteen different languages.

== The Missing Elements ==
Warner has more recently presented a series of lectures at industrial and academic campuses throughout the country on the importance and legacy of green chemistry, titled The Missing Elements. Warner will release a book based on these presentations in 2018, his first since the publication of Green Chemistry: Theory and Practice exactly twenty years prior.

== Personal life ==
Warner has had at least one son, who died of liver failure due to biliary atresia at 2 years old. Warner cites the death of his son as a reason why he became more interested in studying green chemistry.

== Awards ==
Warner has been recognized for his pioneering work with several awards, including:

- 2002: "Distinguished Chemist of the Year Award" from the American Institute of Chemistry's Northeast Division
- 2004: "Presidential Award for Excellence in Science, Mathematics and Engineering Mentorship" from the National Science Foundation
- 2008: "Leadership in Science Award" (with Paul Anastas) from the Council of Scientific Society presidents
- 2011: "Environmental Merit Award" from the US EPA
- 2011: "ACS Fellows Award" from the ACS
- 2012: "Henry Maso Award" from the Society of Cosmetic Chemistry
- 2014: "Perkin Medal" from the Chemical Heritage Foundation
- 2016: "AAAS-Lemelson Invention Ambassador" from the American Association for the Advancement of Science and Lemelson Foundation
- 2016: "Harry & Carol Mosher Award" from the ACS Santa Clara Valley Section
