= Microwave chemistry =

Science of applying microwave radiation to chemical reactions

Microwave chemistry is the science of applying microwave radiation to chemical reactions.

Microwaves act as high frequency electric fields and will generally heat any material containing mobile electric charges, such as polar molecules in a solvent or conducting ions in a solid. Microwave heating occurs primarily through two mechanisms: dipolar polarization and ionic conduction. Polar solvents because their dipole moments attempt to realign with the oscillating electric field, creating molecular friction and dielectric loss. The phase difference between the dipole orientation and the alternating field leads to energy dissipation as heat. Semiconducting and conducting samples heat when ions or electrons within them form an electric current and energy is lost due to the electrical resistance of the material. Domestic and commercial microwave systems typically operate at a frequency of 2.45 GHz, which allows effective energy transfer to polar molecules without quantum mechanical resonance effects. Unlike transitions between quantized rotational bands, microwave energy transfer is a collective phenomenon involving bulk material interactions rather than individual molecular excitations.

Microwave heating in the laboratory began to gain wide acceptance following papers in 1986, although the use of microwave heating in chemical modification can be traced back to the 1950s. Although occasionally known by such acronyms as MAOS (microwave-assisted organic synthesis), MEC (microwave-enhanced chemistry) or MORE synthesis (microwave-organic reaction enhancement), these acronyms have had little acceptance outside a small number of groups.

Microwave chemistry is applied to organic chemistry and to inorganic chemistry.

== Microwave effect ==
There are three classes of microwave effects that are divided differently among sources:

1. Conventional thermal effects, which are the same as conventional heating.
2. Microwave-specific heating effects, which are thermal effects that cannot be (easily) emulated through conventional heating methods. Examples include: (i) selective heating of specific reaction components, (ii) rapid heating rates and temperature gradients, (iii) the elimination of wall effects, and (iv) the superheating of solvents. These tend not to be controversial and invoke "conventional" explanations (i.e. kinetic effects) for the observed effects.
3. Non-thermal microwave effects, which entail some non-thermal coupling of microwave energy directly onto energy modes within the molecule or lattice. Proposed in order to explain unusual observations in microwave chemistry, such effects are controversial.

Older literature tends to lump (2) and (3) together into the specific microwave effects, effects that are different from conventional heating. Newer organic literature tends to only consider (2) when using this term. At the boundary of (2) and (3) are selective excitation of specific molecules/functional groups and stationary hot spots.

=== Specific heating ===
Conventional heating usually involves the use of a furnace or oil bath, which heats the walls of the reactor by convection or conduction. The core of the sample takes much longer to achieve the target temperature, e.g. when heating a large sample of ceramic bricks.

Microwave works via dielectric heating: the oscillating electromagnetic field causes molecular dipoles to rotate. Acting as internal heat source, microwave absorption is able to heat the target compounds without heating the entire furnace or oil bath, which saves time and energy. It is also able to heat sufficiently thin objects throughout their volume (instead of through its outer surface), in theory producing more uniform heating. However, due to the design of most microwave ovens and to uneven absorption by the object being heated, the microwave field is usually non-uniform and localized superheating occurs. Microwave flow reactors can overcome some of the limitations that affect performing microwave chemistry on large volumes.

Different compounds convert microwave radiation to heat by different amounts. This selectivity allows some parts of the object being heated to heat more quickly or more slowly than others (particularly the reaction vessel).

Microwave heating can have certain benefits over conventional ovens:

- reaction rate acceleration
- milder reaction conditions
- higher chemical yield
- lower energy usage
- different reaction selectivities

==== Binary systems ====
A specific application in synthetic chemistry is in the microwave heating of a binary system comprising a polar solvent and a non-polar solvent obtain different temperatures. Applied in a phase transfer reaction a water phase reaches a temperature of 100 °C while a chloroform phase would retain a temperature of 50 °C, providing the extraction as well of the reactants from one phase to the other. Microwave chemistry is particularly effective in dry media reactions.

==== Steady-state hot spots ====
A heterogeneous system (comprising different substances or different phases) may be anisotropic if the loss tangents of the components are considered. As a result, it can be expected that the microwave field energy will be converted to heat by different amounts in different parts of the system. This heterogeneous energy dissipation means selective heating of different parts of the material is possible, and may lead to temperature gradients between them. Nevertheless, the presence of zones with a higher temperature than others (called hot spots) must be subjected to the heat transfer processes between domains. Where the rate of heat conduction is high between system domains, hot spots would have no long-term existence as the components rapidly reach thermal equilibrium. In a system where the heat transfer is slow, it would be possible to have the presence of a steady state hot spot that may enhance the rate of the chemical reaction within that hot zone.

On this basis, many early papers in microwave chemistry postulated the possibility of exciting specific molecules, or functional groups within molecules. However, the time within which thermal energy is repartitioned from such moieties is much shorter than the period of a microwave wave, thus precluding the presence of such 'molecular hot spots' under ordinary laboratory conditions. The oscillations produced by the radiation in these target molecules would be instantaneously transferred by collisions with the adjacent molecules, reaching at the same moment the thermal equilibrium. Processes with solid phases behave somewhat differently. In this case much higher heat transfer resistances are involved, and the possibility of the stationary presence of hot-spots should be contemplated.

A differentiation between two kinds of hot spots has been noted in the literature, although the distinction is considered by many to be arbitrary. Macroscopic hot spots were considered to comprise all large non-isothermal volumes that can be detected and measured by use of optical pyrometers (optical fibre or IR). By these means it is possible to visualise thermal inhomogeneities within solid phases under microwave irradiation. Microscopic hot spots are non-isothermal regions that exist at the micro- or nanoscale (e.g. supported metal nanoparticles inside a catalyst pellet) or in the molecular scale (e.g. a polar group on a catalyst structure). The distinction has no serious significance, however, as microscopic hotspots such as those proposed to explain catalyst behaviour in several gas-phase catalytic reactions have been demonstrated by post-mortem methods and in-situ methods. Some theoretical and experimental approaches have been published towards the clarification of the hot spot effect in heterogeneous catalysts.

=== Non-thermal effects ===
The idea of non-thermal effects is that the microwave energy directly couples to energy modes within the molecule or lattice.

As with stationary hotspots, NTEs are almost certainly non-existent in liquids as the time for energy redistribution between molecules in a liquid is much less than the period of a microwave oscillation. A 2013 essay concluded the effect did not exist in organic synthesis involving liquid phases.

The concept of NTEs is better-developed in the solid phase, where its existence remains an active debate. It is likely that through focusing of electric fields at particle interfaces, microwaves cause plasma formation and enhance diffusion in solids via second-order effects. As a result, they may enhance solid-state sintering processes. Debates continued in 2006 about non-thermal effects of microwaves that have been reported in solid-state phase transitions.

NTE is said to exist in the reaction of O + HCl(DCl) -> OH(OD) + Cl in the gas phase and the authors suggest that some mechanisms may also be present in the condensed phase.

== Catalysis ==
Application of microwave heating to heterogeneous catalysis reactions has not been explored intensively due to presence of metals in supported catalysts and possibility of arcing phenomena in the presence of flammable solvents. However, this scenario becomes unlikely using nanoparticle-sized metal catalysts.

== Extraction ==
Application of microwave heating to extraction is known as microwave-assisted extraction (MAE). MAE is widely used in the extraction of natural products from plant material. It can be performed using a modified domestic microwave oven, though commercial ovens are easier as they provide automated pressure and temperature control. MAE can be open (exposed to air), dynamic (with a pump), nitrogen-protected, done under vacuum, or even combined with ultrasound assisted extraction.

A real-life example of open MAE is the brewing of tea in a domestic microwave oven, a method commonly practiced by Americans to the astonishment of others. An 2012 study from Australia found that brewing a teabag in freshly boiled water for 30 seconds followed by 1 minute of MAE in a microwave oven improves the extraction of catechins and caffeine, compared to the "common household method" of just letting the tea rest in water. (The tea may taste bitterer and more astringent as a result of increased extraction.) ABC Radio Sydney reported on this study in 2017, making the imprecise (but since well-circulated claim) that microwaving is the "best" way to brew tea.
