= Green Chemistry Award =

Discontinued award given by the Royal Society of Chemistry

- Awarded for: Advances in environmentally-focused chemistry
- Sponsored by: Royal Society of Chemistry
- Country: United Kingdom (international)
- Reward: £2000
- Established: 2001
- First award: 2001
- Final award: 2020

First awarded in 2001, the Green Chemistry Award was presented every two years by the Royal Society of Chemistry (RSC) for advances in environmentally focused chemistry. In addition to a prize of £2000, winners of the award complete a UK based lecture tour. The award was discontinued in 2020.

== Winners ==
- 2001: Keith Smith
- 2003: Varinder Aggarwal (University of Bristol)
- 2006: Andrew P Abbott (University of Leicester)
- 2010: Roger Sheldon (Delft University of Technology) for his work in the field of catalysis
- 2012: Edman Tsang (University of Oxford) for development of nanoparticulate catalysts for use in manufacturing
- 2014: Michael North, University of York for his work on Carbon Dioxide as a chemical feedstock.
- 2016: Paul Anastas ( Yale University) for his seminal work in developing innovative methods in molecular design, leading to products and processes that reduce environmental impacts.
- 2018: James Clark, University of York, for the promotion of applied, market-driven green chemistry.
- 2020: Paul Dyson, Ecole Polytechnique Fédérale de Lausanne

== See also ==
- List of chemistry awards
- List of environmental awards
