= Environmental Science & Technology =

- Discipline: Environmental science, environmental engineering
- Language: English
- Edited by: Julie Zimmerman

Publication details
- History: 1967-present
- Publisher: American Chemical Society (United States)
- Frequency: Biweekly
- Impact factor: 10.8 (2023)

Standard abbreviations
- ISO 4: Environ. Sci. Technol.

Indexing
- CODEN: ESTHAG
- ISSN: 0013-936X (print); 1520-5851 (web)

Links
- Journal homepage

Environmental Science & Technology is a biweekly peer-reviewed scientific journal published since 1967 by the American Chemical Society. It covers research in environmental science and environmental technology, including environmental policy. Environmental Science & Technology has a sister journal, Environmental Science & Technology Letters, which publishes short communications.

The editor-in-chief of Environmental Science & Technology is Prof. Julie Zimmerman (Yale University). Previous editors have been: David Sedlak (University of California, Berkeley, 2014 - 2020), James J. Morgan (California Institute of Technology; founding editor, 1967–1975), Russell F. Christman (University of North Carolina, 1975–1987), William H. Glaze (University of North Carolina, 1987–2003) and Jerald L. Schnoor (University of Iowa, 2002–2014).

== Abstracting and indexing ==
According to the Journal Citation Reports, the journal has a 2022 impact factor of 11.4. The journal is abstracted and indexed in:

- Chemical Abstracts Service
- Current Contents/Physical, Chemical & Earth Sciences
- Ei Compendex
- Science Citation Index Expanded
- Scopus

== See also ==
- Environmental Science & Technology Letters
