= California Green Chemistry Initiative =

The California Green Chemistry Initiative (CGCI) is a six-part initiative to reduce public and environmental exposure to toxins through improved knowledge and regulation of chemicals; two parts became statute in 2008. The other four parts were not passed, but are still on the agenda of the California Department of Toxic Substances Control green ribbon science panel discussions. The two parts of the California Green Chemistry Initiative that were passed are known as AB 1879 (Chapter 559, Statutes of 2008): Hazardous Materials and Toxic Substances Evaluation and Regulation and SB 509 (Chapter 560, Statutes of 2008): Toxic Information Clearinghouse. Implementation of CGCI has been delayed indefinitely beyond the January 1, 2011.

== Purpose ==
Green chemistry is the design of chemical products and processes that reduce or eliminate the use and generation of hazardous substances. Green chemistry is based upon twelve principles, initially developed at the US Environmental Protection Agency (EPA) and exemplified in “Green Chemistry: Theory and Practice”. It is an innovative technology which encourages the design of safer chemicals and products and minimizes the impact of wastes through increased energy efficiency, the design of chemical products that degrade after use and the use of renewable resources (instead of non-renewable fossil fuel such as petroleum, gas and coal). The Office of Pollution Prevention and Toxics (OPPT), created under the United States Pollution Prevention Act of 1990, promotes the use of chemistry for pollution prevention through voluntary, non-regulatory ' partnerships with academia, industry, other government agencies, and non-governmental organizations. The United States Environmental Protection Agency (EPA) promotes green chemistry as overseen by the OPPT. The California Green Chemistry Initiative moves beyond voluntary partnerships and voluntary information disclosure to require industry reporting and public disclosure.

== Overview ==
The United States Environmental Protection Agency's most important law to regulate the production, use and disposal of chemicals is the Toxic Substances Control Act of 1976 (TSCA). Over the years, TSCA has fallen behind the industry it is supposed to regulate and is an inadequate tool for providing the protection against today's chemical risks. Green chemistry represents a major paradigm shift in industrial manufacturing as it is a proactive “cradle-to-cradle” approach that focuses environmental protection at the design stage of production processes.

In 2008, California governor Arnold Schwarzenegger signed two joined bills, AB 1879 and SB 507, which created California's Green Chemistry Initiative (CGCI). AB 1879 increases regulatory authority over chemicals in consumer products. The law established an advisory panel of scientists, known as the green ribbon science panel, to guide research in chemical policy, create regulations for assessing alternatives, and set up an internet database of research on toxins. SB 509 was designed to ensure that information regarding the hazard traits, toxicological and environmental endpoints, and other vital data is available to the public, to businesses, and to regulators in a Toxics Information Clearinghouse. This legislation marks the biggest leap forward in California chemicals policy in nearly two decades and is intended to improve the health and safety of all Californians by providing the Department of Toxic Substances Control (DTSC) with the authority to control toxic substances in consumer products.

The bills were scheduled to go into regulatory affect January 1, 2011 with the adoption of the Green Chemistry Initiative. California has postponed the initiative, indefinitely, due to concerns raised by stakeholders and more specifically, controversial last minute changes in the final draft. The final or third draft contains substantial revisions, including scaled back manufacturer and retailer compliance requirements that were not well received by the environmental community. Assemblyman Mike Feur and several authors of AB 1879, assert that last minute changes by the California DTSC have drastically weakened the Green Chemistry Initiative and limited its scope. They are most concerned with the change to require the state to prove that a chemical is harmful before being regulated, mirroring what is currently required at the Federal level by TSCA. The original draft advocated a precautionary principle, or “cradle-to-cradle” approach. Environmentalists fear that CGCI will not remove chemicals off the shelves, but instead will create “paralysis by analysis” as companies litigate against the DTSC over unfavorable decisions.

== Physical and social causes ==
=== Traditional methods of dealing with wastes ===
Society historically managed its industrial and municipal wastes by disposal or incineration. Chemical regulation occurs only after a product is identified as hazardous. This problem-specific approach has led to the release of thousands of potentially harmful chemicals in our environment. Chemical regulation is a continuous game of catch up, in which banned chemicals are replaced with new chemicals that may be just as or more toxic. Many environmental laws are still based on the industrial production model of cradle-to-grave. The term “cradle-to-grave” is used to describe and assess the life-cycle of products, from raw material extraction through materials processing, manufacture, distribution, use and disposal. This traditional approach to chemicals management has serious environmental drawbacks because it does not consider what happens to a product after it is disposed of. The Resource Conservation and Recovery Act (RCRA) of 1976, exemplifies a cradle-to-grave management approach of hazardous waste. RCRA has been largely ineffective because its emphasis is on dealing with waste after it has been created; meanwhile emphasis on waste reduction is minimal. Waste does not disappear, it is simply transported elsewhere. Costly and burdensome hazardous waste disposal in the US has encouraged the exportation of hazardous waste to poor counties and developing nations willing to accept the waste for a fee.

The Green Chemistry initiative instead employs a cradle-to-cradle approach, representing a major paradigm shift in environmental policy and provides a proactive solution to toxic waste. The Earth's capacity to accept toxic waste is practically nonexistent. The disposal of hazardous wastes is not the root problem but rather, the root symptom. The critical issue is the creation of toxic wastes. Requiring manufacturers to consider chemical exposure during manufacturing, throughout product use and after disposal, encourages the production of safer products.

=== Consumption and wastes ===
By the time we find a product on a market shelf, 90% of the resources used to create that product was regarded as waste. This accounts for about 136 pounds of resources a week consumed by the average American and 2,000 pounds of waste support that consumption. As the population grows and the economy expands more and more products will be created, consumed, and disposed. Many negative externalities are related to the environmental consequences of production and use, including air pollution, anthropogenic climate change and water pollution. Under the current cycle of production, toxic chemical byproducts will continue to be produced and unleashed on our environment. It is important to carefully consider how toxic wastes are created in order to forgo the possibility of a world that is unsuitable for human life.

=== Transparency issues ===
One of the biggest failures in market transactions is the imbalance of information that is provided to consumer via producer. “Information asymmetry” is an economic concept that is used to explain this failure: it deals with the study of decisions in transactions where one party has more or better information than the other. Due to a lack of information transparency, the public may lack vital information about the health and safety of products found on supermarket shelves. This lack of information may have led to a reversed purchasing decision. Yet without such labeling, consumers must make assumptions based on things like price or expertise. For example, one apple juice brand may be assumed healthier because it cost more and because the brand is advertised as “healthy” and “recommended by mothers”. Further, it may be assumed that the product is safe for consumption if it is sitting on a grocery store shelf and probably would not be approved by the government if it contained harmful chemicals. Assumptions such as these could inform a typical purchasing decision, despite their inaccuracy. Perhaps given more information, the same brand of apple juice would be less desirable if information on unhealthy preservatives, additives or pesticide residues was easily obtained. To make market transactions more efficient, the government could force more accurate labeling about products, laws could require companies to be more transparent, and the government could require that advertising be less persuasive and more informative. The Green Chemistry Initiative of California would address transparency issues by creating a public chemical inventory and requiring more stringent regulation of chemicals that may be toxic. The CGCI Draft Report suggests a green labeling system to identify consumer products with ingredients harmful to human health and the environment.

=== Stakeholder involvement ===
The United States is the world leader in chemicals manufacturing. As a multibillion-dollar industry, the chemical industry has a leading role in the US economy and because of this, a high level of influence in federal decision-making. Central to the modern world economy, it converts raw materials (oil, natural gas, air, water, metals, and minerals) into more than 70,000 different products. The chemical industry—producers of chemicals, household cleansers, plastics, rubber, paints and explosives, monitors issues including environmental and health policy, taxes and trade. The industry is often the target of environmental groups, which charge that chemicals and chemical waste are polluting the air and water supply. Similar to most industries with pollution problems, chemical manufacturers oppose government regulations that make it more difficult and expensive for them to do business. As do most Republicans, which is why this industry gives nearly three-fourths of its campaign contributions to the GOP. In addition to campaign contributions to elected officials and candidates, companies, labor unions, and other organizations spend billions of dollars each year to lobby Congress and federal agencies. Some special interests retain lobbying firms, many of them located along Washington's K Street; others have lobbyists working in-house.

According to OpenSecrets, the total number of clients lobbying for the chemical industry in 2010 was 143, which is the highest number in history. The first group on this list, American Chemistry Council spent $8,130,000 lobbying last year and Crop America, which comes second, spent $2,291,859 lobbying last year, FMC Corporation spent $1,230,000 and Koch Industries spent $8,070,000. The Chemical Industry wants limited testing of chemicals, more lengthy and costly studies of chemicals already proven to be dangerous, and an assumption that we are only exposed to one chemical at a time, and from one source at a time.

According to Safer Chemicals, Healthy Families, a broad coalition of groups, including major environmental organizations like the Natural Resources Defense Council and the Environmental Defense Fund, health organizations like the Learning Disabilities Association, Breast Cancer Fund, and the Autism Society of America, health professionals and providers like the American Nurses Association, Planned Parenthood Federation of America, and the Mt. Sinai Children's Environmental Health Center, and concerned parents groups like MomsRising: there is growing national momentum and pressure to change the Toxic Substances Control Act (TSCA), our federal system for overseeing chemical safety, which has not been updated in thirty-five years. Polling data indicates overwhelming support for chemical regulation nationwide. According to polling data conducted by the Mellman Group, 84% say that "tightening controls" on chemical regulation is important, with 50% of those calling it "very important.” Public Health Advocates want public disclosure of safety information for all chemicals in use, prompt action to phase out or reduce the most dangerous chemicals, deciding safety based on real world exposure to all sources of toxic chemicals.

== History ==
In 2008, California Governor Arnold Schwarzenegger signed two state bills authorizing the state to identify toxic chemicals in industry and consumer products and analyze alternatives. AB 1879, written by Assemblyman Mike Feur, a Los Angeles Democrat, requires the state Department of Toxic Substances Control to assess chemicals and prioritize the most toxic for possible restrictions or bans. The environmental policy council, made up of heads of all state environmental protection agency boards and departments will oversee the program. SB 509, by Senator Joe Simitian, a Palo Alto Democrat, creates an online toxics information clearinghouse with information about the hazards of thousands of chemicals used in California. These bills are intended to put an end to chemical-by-chemical bans and remove harmful products at the design stage. The regulations are expected to motivate manufacturers of consumer products containing chemicals of concern to seek safer alternatives.

Supporters of the bill include the California Association of Professional Scientists, the Chemical Industry Council of California, DuPont, BIOCOM, Grocery Manufacturers Association, the Breast Cancer Fund, Catholic Healthcare West, in addition to a broad array of environmental groups such as the Coalition for Clean Air, the Environmental Defense Fund, the Natural Resources Defense Council. The American Electronics Association (AEA) and Ford spoke in opposition to the bill, each requesting an exemption from its provisions. Also opposing were environmental justice advocates who indicated the bill did not go far enough. Meanwhile, large trade associations such as Consumer Specialty Products Association, Western States Petroleum Association, American Chemistry Council, CA Manufacturers and Technology Association, and CA Chamber of Commerce officially withdrew opposition to the measures.

Due to outdated and inefficient or otherwise voluntary chemical regulation at the Federal level, the State of California has decided to take regulation into its own hands and develop stricter, environmentally-informed methodologies for dealing with the production of toxic wastes. California's economy is the largest of any state in the US, and is the eighth largest economy in the world. This position gives California an advantage when it comes to environmental standards: the impact of chemical regulation statewide can have a broader impact nationwide if manufacturers desire to stay competitive in California's market. The Green Chemistry Initiative forces statewide industries to comply with greener standards of production, which may spark innovation on a wider basis.

The Green Chemistry initiative aims to regulate the creation and use of materials hazardous to human health and the environment by encouraging innovative design and manufacturing, and ultimately safer consumer product alternatives. To develop the regulatory framework, DTSC held a number of stakeholder and public workshops and invited direct public participation in the drafting of regulations on a wiki website. DTSC reportedly received over 57,000 comments and over 800 regulatory suggestions. Regulatory suggestions included industry assessments of risk and safety, alternative chemicals and life-cycle assessments and mandatory industry reporting, full public disclosure of substances contained in products, a green labelling program that would inform consumers of the potential health and environmental impacts of the chemicals contained in products and a mandated surcharge on chemicals and products to support a fund to address environmental problems. In December 2008, DTSC announced six policy recommendations for the Green Chemistry Initiative. In brief, those recommendations are:

1. expand pollution prevention
2. develop green chemistry workforce education and training, research and development, technology transfer
3. online product ingredient network
4. online toxics clearing house
5. accelerate the quest for safer products
6. move toward cradle to cradle economy

Two of the six recommendations from this report were adopted: AB 1879 requires the DTSC to implement regulations to identify and prioritize chemicals of concern, evaluate alternatives, and specify regulatory responses where chemicals are found in products. SB 509 requires an online, public toxics information clearinghouse that includes science-based information on the toxicity and hazard traits of chemicals used in daily life. Essentially the recommended policy methods include authority tools that would regulate the approval on new chemicals in a more cautious manner as well as mandate the decimation of information, as provided by manufacturers to the public; innovation would be encouraged under this paradigm to replace harmful chemicals with greener alternatives and the California government would fund programs to help industries produce greener chemicals. Secondly, capacity or learning tools would be provided to the public in the form of the online database, giving the tools so that they have better ability to make market decisions that reflect their interests.

== Criticism ==
Environmentalists say the amended regulations won't remove toxic products from the shelves and will create "paralysis by analysis," as industries can litigate against DTSC over unfavorable department decisions. Activists say California was poised to lead the way on toxics regulation but now is faced with potentially one of the weakest chemical-regulatory mechanisms in the nation. According to CHANGE (Californians for a Healthy & Green Economy), the revised regulation is a betrayal of the Green Chemistry promise and ignores two years of public input, while caving to backroom industry lobbying. Furthermore, it is a betrayal to public interest groups, businesses, and residents of California and legislators who supported the intent of this bill, to protect Californians and spur a healthy, innovative green economy. Environmentalists say the toxics department gutted the initiative at the behest of the chemical industry, and then put out the changes for public comment during a 15-day period just before Thanksgiving. This was a violation of the law requiring a 45-day public comment period when a substantial reworking of state regulations is proposed. The new Director of California's Department of Toxic Substance Control, Debbie Raphael, announced that mid-October 2011 is the new target date for new draft regulations to implement California's Green Chemistry Law and new draft guidelines were issued October 31, 2011. The public comment period for the latest version of the draft regulations ends December 30, 2011.

Implementation of CGCI has been delayed indefinitely beyond the January 1, 2011 deadline due to issues that arose after public review of the third draft. The third draft, which was made public December 2010, contains substantial revisions, including scaled back manufacturer and retailer compliance requirements that were not well received by the environmental community. DTSCs newest draft has made the following changes:

- All references of nanotechnology are excluded (nano referring to materials with dimensions of 1,000 nanometers or smaller); this change is significant because it would have been considered the most significant attempt to regulate nanomaterials based on environmental or health impacts.
- The new draft redefines “responsible entities,” which originally referred to the entire business chain of consumer products distribution, including manufacturers, brand name owners, importers, distributors, and retailers, “responsible entities is now limited to manufacturers and retailers .
- DTSC prioritizes Children's products, personal care products and household products until 2016, after that point all consumer products.
- The new proposed regulations also eliminate the requirement that the DTSC develop a list of chemicals of consideration and products under consideration.
- New timeline for implementation of regulations
