= Environmental Science & Technology Letters =

- Discipline: Environmental science Environmental technology
- Language: English
- Edited by: Bryan Brooks

Publication details
- History: 2014–present
- Publisher: American Chemical Society
- Frequency: Continuous
- Open access: Hybrid
- Impact factor: 10.9 (2022)

Standard abbreviations
- ISO 4: Environ. Sci. Technol. Lett.

Indexing
- ISSN: 2328-8930
- OCLC no.: 870429413

Links
- Journal homepage; Online access; Online archive

Environmental Science & Technology Letters is an online-only peer-reviewed scientific journal publishing brief research reports in the fields of environmental science and technology. It was first opened to submissions in 2013, with its first articles published online in January 2014. It was established by the American Chemical Society to serve as a sister journal to their existing journal, Environmental Science & Technology, with an expedited time to publication. To this end, the journal publishes all articles as soon as publishable after acceptance, though they are also summarized in monthly issues. The editor-in-chief is Prof. Bryan Brooks (Baylor University). According to the Journal Citation Reports, the journal has a 2022 impact factor of 10.9.

== See also ==
- Environmental Science & Technology
