= Substitution of dangerous chemicals =

Hazardous chemical reduction strategies

The substitution of dangerous chemicals in the workplace is the process of replacing or eliminating the use chemicals that have significant chemical hazards. The goal of the substitution process is to improve occupational health and safety and minimize harmful environmental impacts. The process can be time-consuming; assessments of dangers, costs, and practicality may be necessary. Substituting hazardous chemicals follows the principles of green chemistry and can result in clean technology.

== Chemical alternative assessments ==
Alternatives assessments are used to determine which chemical is fit to be a substitute. A process-based method of substituting chemicals in the workplace involves:

1. Listing the chemicals
2. Noting composition information
3. Filling data sheets
4. Conducting a process analysis
5. Assessing risk
6. Submitting a substitute proposal

Safety data sheets contain pertinent information about hazards associated with chemicals, including short- and long-term effects. A process analysis is performed, which studies how and when the chemical is used and what technology, equipment, and chemistry are needed.

If a risk is not "small", then possible substitutions are considered. A chemical has a "small" risk to humans if there are no long-term negative effects. The exposure is lower than the threshold limit value (TLV), and there are no risks of disease or other health issues.

Several factors must be assessed to determine if a chemical is a suitable substitute including potential hazards, exposure, technical feasibility, and low-budget considerations. After substitutes are proposed, the risks of each substitute are compared to one another and tested until a suitable substitution is found.

=== Hazard assessment ===
The potential hazards of a chemical or a substitute candidate must be assessed by noting the toxicity of the chemical to both humans and the environment. An assessment of the chemical should list the dangerous properties of the chemical, such as flammability or corrosivity. It should also note any carcinogenic, reprotoxic, allergenic, neurotoxic, and other related effects on the chemical has on human health.

=== Exposure characterization ===
If a potential chemical substitute has greater exposure to humans and the environment than the original chemical, the toxicity of increased exposure must be considered. A chemical substitute with less exposure or a similar exposure but lower toxicity is preferred.

=== Life-Impacts characterization ===
A life-cycle assessment of the chemical considers the long-term effects a chemical will have on human health and the environment, as well as the ethical and social effects of chemical use. Examples include the addition of greenhouse gas emissions from the use of a chemical or carcinogenic effects of a chemical after prolonged usage. An ethical or social effect considered during the assessment could include a consideration of if the chemical is ethically sourced or if its use infringes on the rights of indigenous people.

=== Technical feasibility ===
A chemical substitute performs the intended task efficiently.

=== Economic feasibility ===
The availability of the chemical commercially in the quantities required is noted. A substitution that is more cost-efficient is ideal, but is not always available.

== Legislature ==
Enacted in the EU in 2006, REACH requires industries to collect safety information on their chemicals and report them to a database. It also requires the substitution of dangerous chemicals to safer alternatives if they are found.

The EPA uses the Toxic Substances Control Act (TSCA) to require industries to record and report the production, use, and disposal of specific dangerous chemicals.

== Examples ==
Substitution of hazardous chemicals can be on different levels such as using:

1. Less hazardous chemicals in the same process:
  1. For construction paints: from organic solvents to water-based paints,
  2. In printing industry for cleaning of printing machines: from organic solvents to products based on esters of vegetable oils,
2. A new design of the process:
  1. In metal degreasing: from vapor degreasing with trichloroethylene to high pressure hosing with hot alkaline solution in a closed system,
  2. In brazing: from fluxes containing boron and fluorine compounds to use of a furnace with reducing atmosphere,
3. A new process:
  1. Removal of old paint: from a mixture of dichloromethane and methanol to blasting with steel sand in a closed system.
  2. From bonding with adhesives to a new design of items locking them mechanically together, mutually,
4. Avoid the use of the process:
  1. Avoiding electroplating with nickel only applied for cosmetic reasons.
  2. Wooden furniture: from lacquer with organic solvents to no surface treatment especially used for furniture of quality.
5. Avoid production of products which have hazardous processes.

== See also ==
- Hazard substitution
