= Edward C. Taylor =

American chemist

Edward Curtis Taylor, Jr. (August 3, 1923 – November 22, 2017) was an American chemist who designed and synthesized the chemotherapy drug pemetrexed (brand name Alimta), an inhibitor of purine biosynthesis, with grant support from the U.S. National Cancer Institute, NIH. As of 2009, royalties for this drug from Eli Lilly & Co. paid to Princeton University were sufficient to completely finance a state-of-the-art 263,000-square-foot (24,400 m^{2}) chemistry laboratory building. Taylor studied for his PhD from 1946 to 1949 at Cornell University with Professor Cornelius Cain. Taylor trained 187 PhD students.

== Biography ==
He was born in Springfield, Massachusetts on August 3, 1923. He had first enrolled at Hamilton College then transferred to Cornell and received both his B.A. in 1946 and then his Ph.D. in 1949, both from Cornell University. He was a Merck Postdoctoral Fellow from 1949 to 1950 at the National Academy of Sciences in Zürich, Switzerland under Leopold Ruzicka. He was a du Pont Postdoctoral Fellow at the University of Illinois from 1950 to 1951. He was the A. Barton Hepburn Professor of Organic Chemistry, Emeritus, joined the Princeton faculty in 1954 and transferred to emeritus status in 1997.

In 2006 Taylor was named a Hero of Chemistry by the American Chemical Society.

He died on November 22, 2017.
