= 1,3-Propanediol =

Skeletal formula of 1,3-propanediol
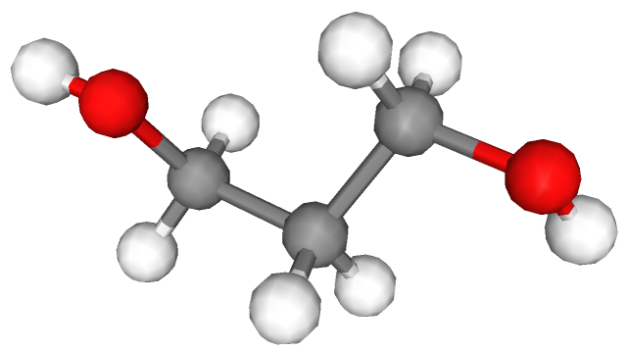
Spacefill model of 1,3-propanediol
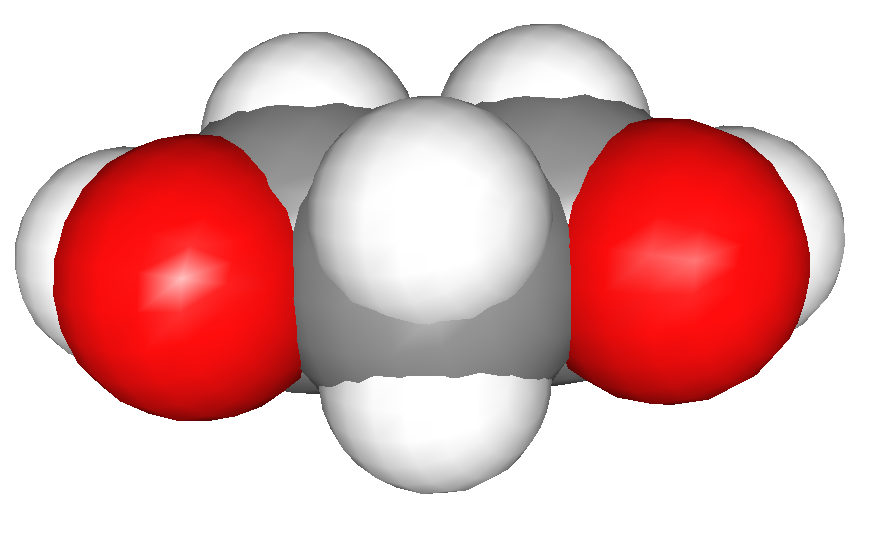
- Ball and stick model of 1,3-propanediol

Names
- Preferred IUPAC name Propane-1,3-diol
- Other names 1,3-Dihydroxypropane; Trimethylene glycol

Identifiers
CAS Number	504-63-2
3D model (JSmol)	Interactive image
Abbreviations	PDO
Beilstein Reference	969155
ChEBI	CHEBI:16109
ChEMBL	ChEMBL379652
ChemSpider	13839553
DrugBank	DB02774
ECHA InfoCard	100.007.271
EC Number	207-997-3
KEGG	C02457
MeSH	1,3-propanediol
PubChem CID	10442
RTECS number	TY2010000
UNII	5965N8W85T
CompTox Dashboard (EPA)	DTXSID30897465 DTXSID8041246, DTXSID30897465
- InChI: InChI=1S/C3H8O2/c4-2-1-3-5/h4-5H,1-3H2 Key: YPFDHNVEDLHUCE-UHFFFAOYSA-N; Key: YPFDHNVEDLHUCE-UHFFFAOYAS
- SMILES: OCCCO

Properties
Chemical formula	CH_{2}(CH_{2}OH)_{2}
Molar mass	76.095 g·mol^{−1}
Appearance	Colourless liquid
Density	1.0597 g cm^{−3}
Melting point	−27 °C; −17 °F; 246 K
Boiling point	211 to 217 °C; 412 to 422 °F; 484 to 490 K
Solubility in water	Miscible
Solubility	acetone, alcohols, pyridine
log P	−1.093
Vapor pressure	4.5 Pa
Refractive index (n_{D})	1.440

Thermochemistry
Std enthalpy of formation (Δ_{f}H^{⦵}_{298})	−485.9–−475.7 kJ mol^{−1}
Std enthalpy of combustion (Δ_{c}H^{⦵}_{298})	−1848.1–−1837.9 kJ mol^{−1}

Hazards
NFPA 704 (fire diamond)	2 2 0
Flash point	79.444 °C (174.999 °F; 352.594 K)
Autoignition temperature	400 °C (752 °F; 673 K)
Safety data sheet (SDS)	sciencelab.com

Related compounds
Related glycols	Ethylene glycol, 1,2-propanediol
- Except where otherwise noted, data are given for materials in their standard state (at 25 °C [77 °F], 100 kPa). verify (what is ?) Infobox references

1,3-Propanediol is the organic compound with the formula CH_{2}(CH_{2}OH)_{2}. This 3-carbon diol is a colorless viscous liquid that is miscible with water. It is soluble in many common organic solvents, except benzene, carbon tetrachloride, diethyl ether, methyl isobutyl ketone, and nitromethane.

== Products ==
1,3-Propanediol is mainly used as a building block in the production of polymers such as polytrimethylene terephthalate.

1,3-Propanediol can be formulated into a variety of industrial products including composites, adhesives, laminates, coatings, moldings, aliphatic polyesters, and copolyesters. It is also a common solvent. It is used as an antifreeze and as a component in wood paint.

== Production ==
1,3-Propanediol is mainly produced by the hydration of acrolein. An alternative route involves the hydroformylation of ethylene oxide to form 3-hydroxypropionaldehyde. The aldehyde is subsequently hydrogenated to give 1,3-propanediol. Biotechnological routes are also known.

Two other routes involve bioprocessing by certain micro-organisms:

- Conversion from glucose effected by a genetically modified strain of E. coli by DuPont Tate & Lyle BioProducts (See: bioseparation of 1,3-propanediol). An estimated 120,000 tons were produced in 2007". According to DuPont, the Bio-PDO process uses 40% less energy than conventional processes, Because of DuPont and Tate & Lyle's success in developing a renewable Bio-PDO process, the American Chemical Society awarded the Bio-PDO research teams the "2007 Heroes of Chemistry" award.
- Conversion from glycerol (a by-product of biodiesel production) using Clostridium diolis bacteria and Enterobacteriaceae.

== Safety ==
1,3-Propanediol does not appear to pose a significant hazard via inhalation of either the vapor or a vapor/aerosol mixture.

== See also ==
- Butylene glycol
- Ethylene glycol
- Polylactic acid
- Propylene glycol
