= Julie Zimmerman =

American chemist

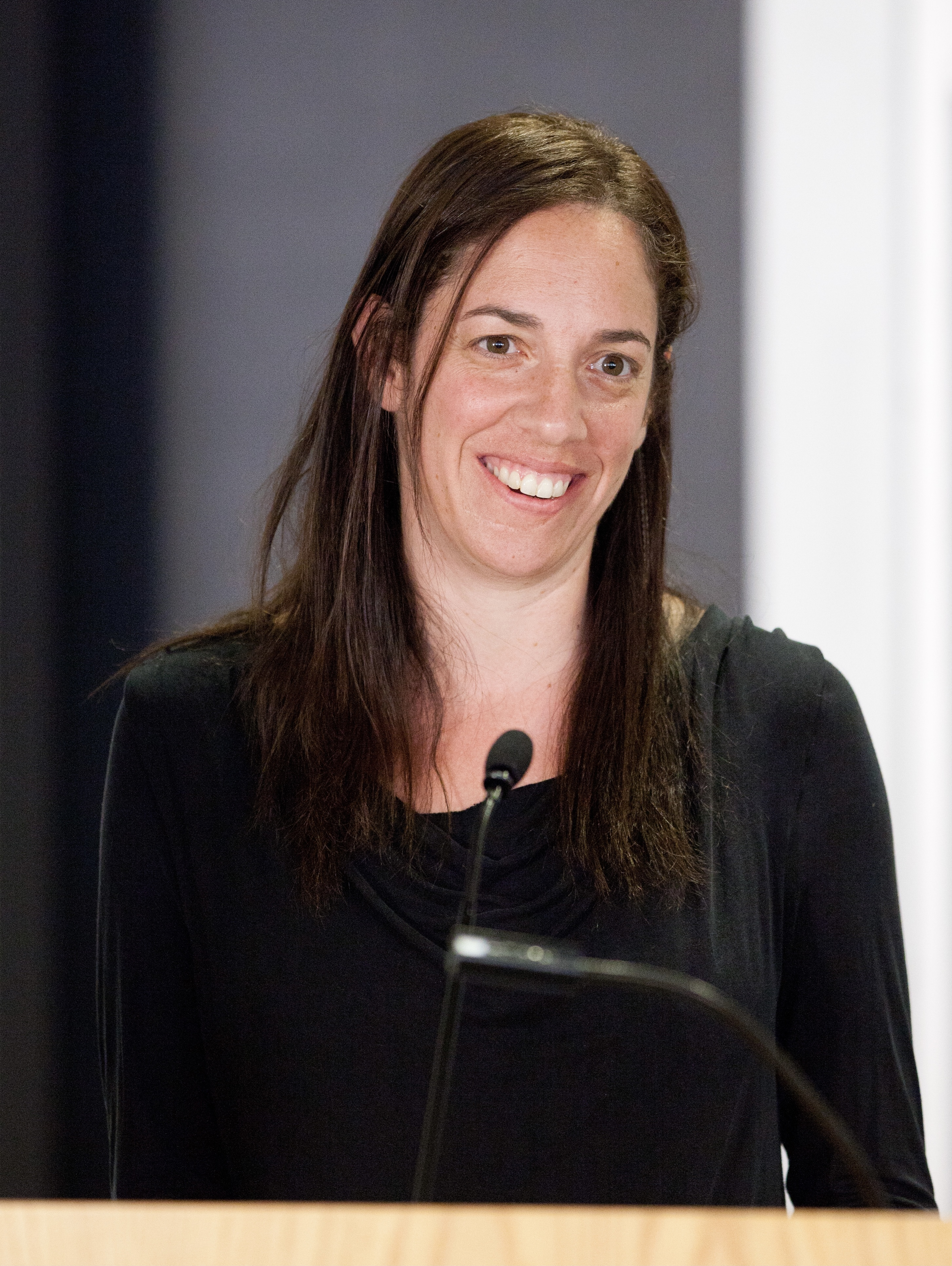
- Zimmerman in 2011
- Born: South Brunswick, New Jersey
- Spouse: Paul Anastas (m. 2006)

Academic background
- Education: B.S., University of Virginia; MS, PhD, environmental and water resources engineering and resource policy and behavior, University of Michigan
- Thesis: Formulation and evaluation of emulsifier systems for petroleum- and bio-based semi-synthetic metalworking fluids. (2003)

Julie Beth Zimmerman is an American chemist. She is a professor at Yale University and the editor-in-chief of Environmental Science & Technology.

== Early life and education ==
Zimmerman was born to parents Shellie and Samuel Zimmerman in South Brunswick, New Jersey. Zimmerman completed her Bachelor of Science degree from the University of Virginia and her PhD from the University of Michigan.

== Career ==
Upon completing her PhD, Zimmerman became a program manager and environmental engineer in the office of research and development at the United States Environmental Protection Agency and a visiting professor in the department of civil engineering at the University of Virginia. Following her marriage to Paul Anastas in 2006, they both joined the faculty at Yale University. As an assistant professor in both the School of Engineering and Applied Science and the School of Forestry & Environmental Studies, Zimmerman also served as the assistant director for research at the Center for Green Chemistry and Green Engineering. While serving in these roles, she also received a grant from the National Science Foundation (NSF) to research water management issues in the U.S. Great Lakes region. In 2010, Zimmerman co-authored Environmental Engineering Fundamentals, Sustainability, Design with James R. Mihelcic.

Following her promotion to associate professor, Zimmerman continued to focus her research on the application of green chemistry and green engineering principles to the design of products, processes, and systems. As a result, she was honored with the 2012 Walter L. Huber Civil Engineering Research Prize for "innovative research and development of sustainable, cost-effective technologies for the treatment of drinking water." The following year, she was named the inaugural Donna L. Dubinsky Associate Professor of Environmental Engineering.

In 2014, Zimmerman was promoted to the rank of full professor with tenure and elected to the Connecticut Academy of Science and Engineering. She was also elected to the Royal Society of Chemistry in 2015. In January 2020, Zimmerman was appointed the editor-in-chief of the ACS journal Environmental Science & Technology, succeeding David L. Sedlak. She was named the winner of the 2020 Ackerman Award for Teaching and Mentoring.

In 2025, Zimmerman was elected a member of the National Academy of Engineering for her "leadership in education and the development of green technologies that enhance the sustainability of engineered systems."

== Selected publications ==
- Environmental Engineering Fundamentals, Sustainability, Design (2010)
