= Bioseparation of 1,3-propanediol =

Method of chemical production

Bioseparation of 1,3-propanediol is a biochemical process for production of 1,3-propanediol (PDO). PDO is an organic compound with many commercial applications. Conventionally, PDO is produced from crude oil products such as propylene or ethylene oxide. In recent years, however, companies such as DuPont are investing in the biological production of PDO using renewable feedstocks such as corn.

== History ==
In May 2004, DuPont and Tate & Lyle announced that they would start up a joint venture to build a facility that produces polymers from renewable feedstock instead of petrochemicals. In particular, their goal was to design a fermentation system that converts corn sugar into PDO (propanediol manufactured in this way is referred to in the media as "BioPDO"). They argue that using such a bioprocess is more energy efficient than conventional petrochemical processes (conversion of propylene into propanediol) because the bioprocess has four advantages over the conventional process: smaller environmental footprint, lower operating costs, smaller capital investment, and greater sustainability due to use of renewable corn feedstock.

== Process ==
BioPDO can be made by the bacterial fermentation of glycerol. However, DuPont has managed to engineer a strain of Escherichia coli (E. coli), a common bacterium, to allow industrial-scale production of 1,3-propanediol by fermentation of glucose. After the E. coli produce sufficient BioPDO product, DuPont uses a method to separate the BioPDO from the cellular broth that comes out of the bioreactor consisting of four steps: microfiltration and ultrafiltration, ion exchange, flash evaporation, and distillation.

=== Filtration ===
The first of the two filtration steps, microfiltration, is used to remove the cells from the reactor broth. Ceramic filters are used because, although expensive, they can last for five to ten years. High temperatures have been found to increase the flux of liquid across the microfiltration membrane, so a minimum temperature of 165 °F (74 °C) is specified. A series of three ultrafiltration membranes are used to filter out proteins with a molecular weight of 5,000 daltons and higher. The feed pressure to the microfiltration membrane is typically 65 psia with a transmembrane pressure drop of 40 psia. The feed pressure to each ultrafiltration membrane is 60 psia. Using these feed pressures and temperatures, typical transmembrane liquid fluxes are 108 LMH (liters per hour per square meter) for the microfiltration membrane, and 26 LMH for the ultrafiltration membrane.

=== Ion exchange ===
The next step of the scheme, ion exchange, removes impurities that cause the downstream polymer product to turn yellow. Four ion exchange columns in series are used to remove these impurities, and they are arranged in the following order:

1. Strong acid cationic exchanger
2. Strong base anionic exchanger
3. Strong acid cationic exchanger
4. Strong base anionic exchanger

The first cationic exchanger replaces the divalent cations in solution with hydrogen ions. The first anionic exchanger replaces the anions in solution with hydroxide ions. The second cationic and anionic exchangers further reduce ion levels in solution. Note that hydrogen ions (H^{+} spontaneously react with hydroxide ions (OH^{−}) to form water (H_{2}O):

H^{+} + OH^{−} → H_{2}O

=== Flash evaporation ===
After the ion exchange step, excess water is produced from the hydrogen and hydroxide ions, and that can dilute the product to less than 10% concentration by weight. By sending the dilute solution to an evaporation system under vacuum, water will flash out of the solution into low-pressure steam, leaving a propanediol solution with up to 80% propanediol by weight. The low-pressure steam is then compressed to a higher pressure and temperature, and afterward directed to the outer casing of the flash evaporation unit to heat the system.

=== Distillation ===
The final step of the scheme, distillation, comprises two distillation columns, and optionally four distillation columns. The three main types of chemicals in the fluid at this stage of the separation are water, BioPDO, and impurities such as glycerol, sugars, and proteins. Of the three chemicals water has the lowest boiling point (see the water, 1,3-propanediol, and glycerol articles for boiling point information), so it is removed as distillate in the first column. The bottoms of the first column is then sent to a second column, where BioPDO is removed as distillate because of its lower boiling point. Both columns operate under low pressure (55 mm Hg in the first column; 20 mm Hg in the second column) to lower the boiling points of the distillate and bottoms streams, thereby using a lower pressure steam than that for atmospheric columns. At this point, the BioPDO stream has 99% purity. If the BioPDO is to be used for polymer production, however, then greater purity is required. To achieve greater purity, the BioPDO distillate of the second column is sent to a hydrogenation reactor to convert the remaining polymer-coloring impurities into non-coloring chemicals. The effluent of the reactor is then sent to a second set of two distillation columns that operate the same way as the first set of columns. The BioPDO distillate of the fourth distillation column has a purity of 99.97%, which is able to meet polymer- and fiber-grade standards.

== Energy efficiency of process ==
According to DuPont, the BioPDO process uses 40% less energy than conventional processes. DuPont also claims that the bioprocess reduces greenhouse gas emissions by 20%, and that the production of one hundred million pounds of BioPDO annually "saves the energy equivalent of fifteen million gallons of gasoline per year". Because of DuPont and Tate & Lyle's success in developing a renewable BioPDO process, the American Chemical Society awarded the BioPDO research teams the "2007 Heroes of Chemistry" award.
