= California Department of Toxic Substances Control =

Department of Toxic Substances Control
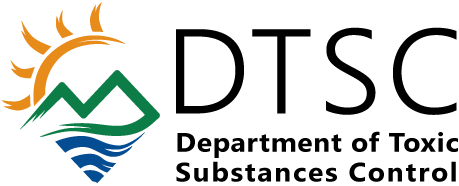

Agency overview
- Formed: 1991
- Preceding agency: Toxic Substances Control Division of the California Department of Public Health
- Jurisdiction: Statewide jurisdiction over toxic substances control
- Agency executives: Meredith Williams, director; Mehdi Bettahar, deputy director; Brian Brown, chief financial officer; Katie Butler, deputy director; Don Foley, chief information officer; Surlene Grant, deputy director; Lawrence Hafetz, chief counsel; Aaron Robertson, deputy director
- Parent agency: California Environmental Protection Agency

The California Department of Toxic Substances Control (or DTSC) is an agency of the government of the state of California which protects public health and the environment from hazardous waste. DTSC is part of the California Environmental Protection Agency, with one thousand employees, and is headquartered in Sacramento. As of 2023, DTSC has regional offices in Berkeley, Chatsworth, Clovis, Commerce, Cypress, El Centro and San Diego and environmental chemistry laboratories in Berkeley and Pasadena. Meredith Williams has served as the director of DTSC since 2019.

== History ==
The Hazardous Waste Control Act of 1972 established legal standards for hazardous waste. Accordingly, in 1972, the Department of Health Services (now called the California Health and Human Services Agency) created a hazardous waste management unit, staffing it in 1973 with five employees concerned primarily with developing regulations and setting fees for the disposal of hazardous waste. In 1978, the Love Canal disaster caused an upswing in funding for the unit, which grew to seventy people before being made an official branch of the department.

In 1981, the unit was renamed to the Toxic Substances Control Division, consisting of a laboratory in Berkeley and a headquarters office in Sacramento, and took on public information duties. Eventually, the Division was severed from the Department of Health Services and placed under the new California Environmental Protection Agency.

The agency has since expanded to include the regulation of commercial products including toys, jewelry and food packaging.

== Areas of responsibility ==
DTSC regulates the generation, handling, treatment and disposal of hazardous waste in California. DTSC also cleans up hazardous waste sites in California such as disposal sites and industrial sites that resulted in contamination of soil and groundwater. Since 1 October 2013, DTSC can impose a range of regulatory responses to address hazards or potential harmful exposure. According to the Safer Consumer Products regulations, DTSC may: require additional product information for consumers; impose use restrictions on chemicals and products; prohibit the sale of a product; require engineering controls; require end-of-life management; or order funding for green chemistry research.

=== Programs and laws ===
In cooperation with the United States Environmental Protection Agency, DTSC administers state and federal hazardous waste programs including:

- California Environmental Quality Act—CEQA;
- Resource Conservation and Recovery Act—RCRA
- Comprehensive Environmental Response, Compensation, and Liability Act—CERCLA
- Toxic Substances Control Act—TSCA of 1976.
- California Green Chemistry Initiative, becoming statute in 2008.
- RCRA (Resources Conservation and Recovery Act)
- and a number of other State and Federal bodies of law dealing with hazardous materials and the environment.

=== Office of Criminal Investigations ===
Within DTSC's Hazardous Waste Management Program is the Office of Criminal Investigations (OCI). OCI is staffed with criminal investigators (sworn California State Peace Officers), environmental scientists and computer forensics specialists. DTSC Investigators are duly sworn peace officers of the State of California. They are authorized to conduct investigations, make arrests, and carry firearms (among other duties).

As of 2015, Hansen Pang is the director of OCI.

== Criticism ==
In 2015, Exide lead contamination raised concerns about longstanding problems at the state Department of Toxic Substances Control. The governor and state legislators sought new laws, oversight hearings, and other reform efforts after a battery recycling facility east of Los Angeles was allowed to operate without a full permit for more than three decades and the company was not required to set aside adequate funds to clean up pollution coming from the plant.
