= Green chemistry metrics =

Green chemistry metrics describe aspects of a chemical process relating to the principles of green chemistry. The metrics serve to quantify the efficiency or environmental performance of chemical processes, and allow changes in performance to be measured. The motivation for using metrics is the expectation that quantifying technical and environmental improvements can make the benefits of new technologies more tangible, perceptible, or understandable. This, in turn, is likely to aid the communication of research and potentially facilitate the wider adoption of green chemistry technologies in industry.

For a non-chemist, an understandable method of describing the improvement might be a decrease of X unit cost per kilogram of compound Y. This, however, might be an over-simplification. For example, it would not allow a chemist to visualize the improvement made or to understand changes in material toxicity and process hazards. For yield improvements and selectivity increases, simple percentages are suitable, but this simplistic approach may not always be appropriate. For example, when a highly pyrophoric chemical is replaced by a benign one, a numerical value is difficult to assign but the improvement is obvious, if all other factors are similar.

Numerous metrics have been formulated over time. A general problem is that the more accurate and universally applicable the metric devised, the more complex and unemployable it becomes. A good metric must be clearly defined, simple, measurable, objective rather than subjective and must ultimately drive the desired behavior.

== Mass-based versus impact-based metrics ==
The fundamental purpose of metrics is to allow comparisons. If there are several economically viable ways to make a product, which one causes the least environmental harm (i.e. which is the greenest)? The metrics that have been developed to achieve that purpose fall into two groups: mass-based metrics and impact-based metrics.

The simplest metrics are based upon the mass of materials rather than their impact. Atom economy, E-factor, yield, reaction mass efficiency and effective mass efficiency are all metrics that compare the mass of desired product to the mass of waste. They do not differentiate between more harmful and less harmful wastes. A process that produces less waste may appear to be greener than the alternatives according to mass-based metrics but may in fact be less green if the waste produced is particularly harmful to the environment. This serious limitation means that mass-based metrics can not be used to determine which synthetic method is greener. However, mass-based metrics have the great advantage of simplicity: they can be calculated from readily available data with few assumptions. For companies that produce thousands of products, mass-based metrics may be the only viable choice for monitoring company-wide reductions in environmental harm.

In contrast, impact-based metrics such as those used in life-cycle assessment evaluate environmental impact as well as mass, making them much more suitable for selecting the greenest of several options or synthetic pathways. Some of them, such as those for acidification, ozone depletion, and resource depletion, are just as easy to calculate as mass-based metrics but require emissions data that may not be readily available. Others, such as those for inhalation toxicity, ingestion toxicity, and various forms of aquatic eco toxicity, are more complex to calculate in addition to requiring emissions data.

== Atom economy ==
Atom economy was designed by Barry Trost as a framework by which organic chemists would pursue “greener” chemistry. The atom economy number is how much of the reactants remain in the final product.
$$\text{Atom economy} = \frac{\text{molecular mass of desire product}}{\text{molecular masses of reactants}} \times 100\%$$

For a generic multi-stage reaction used for producing R:

A + B → P + X
P + C → Q + Y
Q + D → R + Z

The atom economy is calculated by
$$\text{Atom economy} = \frac{\text{molecular mass of R}}{\text{molecular masses of A, B, C and D}} \times 100\%$$

The conservation of mass principle dictates that the total mass of the reactants is the same as the total mass of the products. In the above example, the sum of molecular masses of A, B, C and D should be equal to that of R, X, Y and Z. As only R is the useful product, the atoms of X, Y and Z are said to be wasted as by-products. Economic and environmental costs of disposal of these waste make a reaction with low atom economy to be "less green".

A further simplified version of this is the carbon economy. It is how much carbon ends up in the useful product compared to how much carbon was used to create the product.
$$\text{Carbon economy} = \frac{\text{number of carbon atoms in desire product}}{\text{number of carbon atoms in reactants}} \times 100\%$$

This metric is a good simplification for use in the pharmaceutical industry as it takes into account the stoichiometry of reactants and products. Furthermore, this metric is of interest to the pharmaceutical industry where development of carbon skeletons is key to their work.

The atom economy calculation is a simple representation of the “greenness” of a reaction as it can be carried out without the need for experimental results. Nevertheless, it can be useful in the process synthesis early stage design.

The drawback of this type of analysis is that assumptions have to be made. In an ideal chemical process, the amount of starting materials or reactants equals the amount of all products generated and no atom is lost. However, in most processes, some of the consumed reactant atoms do not become part of the products, but remain as unreacted reactants, or are lost in some side reactions. Besides, solvents and energy used for the reaction are ignored in this calculation, but they may have non-negligible impacts to the environment.

== Percentage yield ==
Percentage yield is calculated by dividing the amount of the obtained desired product by the theoretical yield. In a chemical process, the reaction is usually reversible, thus reactants are not completely converted into products; some reactants are also lost by undesired side reaction. To evaluate these losses of chemicals, actual yield has to be measured experimentally.

$$\text{Percentage yield} = \frac{\text{actual mass of product}}{\text{theoretical mass of product}} \times 100\%$$

As percentage yield is affected by chemical equilibrium, allowing one or more reactants to be in great excess can increase the yield. However, this may not be considered as a "greener" method, as it implies a greater amount of the excess reactant remain unreacted and therefore wasted. To evaluate the use of excess reactants, the excess reactant factor can be calculated.

$$\text{Excess reactant factor} = \frac{\text{stoichiometric mass of reactants} + \text{excess mass of reactant(s)}}{\text{stoichiometric mass of reactants}}$$

If this value is far greater than 1, then the excess reactants may be a large waste of chemicals and costs. This can be a concern when raw materials have high economic costs or environmental costs in extraction.

In addition, increasing the temperature can also increase the yield of some endothermic reactions, but at the expense of consuming more energy. Hence this may not be attractive methods as well.

== Reaction mass efficiency ==
The reaction mass efficiency is the percentage of actual mass of desire product to the mass of all reactants used. It takes into account both atom economy and chemical yield.

$$\text{Reaction mass efficiency} = \frac{\text{actual mass of desired product}}{\text{mass of reactants}} \times 100\%$$
$$\text{Reaction mass efficiency} = \frac{\text{atom economy} \times \text{percentage yield}}{\text{excess reactant factor}}$$

Reaction mass efficiency, together with all metrics mentioned above, shows the “greenness” of a reaction but not of a process. Neither metric takes into account all waste produced. For example, these metrics could present a rearrangement as “very green” but fail to address any solvent, work-up, and energy issues that make the process less attractive.

== Effective mass efficiency ==
A metric similar to reaction mass efficiency is the effective mass efficiency. It is defined as the percentage of the mass of the desired product relative to the mass of all non-benign reagents used in its synthesis. The reagents here may include any used reactant, solvent or catalyst.

$$\text{Effective mass efficiency} = \frac{\text{actual mass of desire products}}{\text{mass of non-benign reagents}} \times 100\%$$

Note that when most reagents are benign, the effective mass efficiency can be greater than 100%. This metric requires further definition of a benign substance. Hudlicky defines it as “those by-products, reagents or solvents that have no environmental risk associated with them, for example, water, low-concentration saline, dilute ethanol, autoclaved cell mass, etc.”. This definition leaves the metric open to criticism, as nothing is absolutely benign (which is a subjective term), and even the substances listed in the definition have some environmental impact associated with them. The formula also fails to address the level of toxicity associated with a process. Until all toxicology data is available for all chemicals and a term dealing with these levels of “benign” reagents is written into the formula, the effective mass efficiency is not the best metric for chemistry.

== Environmental factor ==
The first general metric for green chemistry remains one of the most flexible and popular ones. Roger A. Sheldon’s environmental factor (E-factor) can be made as complex and thorough or as simple as desired and useful.

The E-factor of a process is the ratio of the mass of waste per mass of product:

$$\text{E-factor}=\frac{\text{mass of total waste}}{\text{mass of product}}$$

As examples, Sheldon calculated E-factors of various industries:

Table E-Factors across the chemical industry
Industry sector	Annual production (t)	E-factor	Waste produced (t)
Oil refining	10^{6} – 10^{8}	Ca. 0.1	10^{5} – 10^{7}
Bulk chemicals	10^{4} – 10^{6}	< 1 – 5	10^{4} – 5×10^{6}
Fine chemicals	10^{2} – 10^{4}	5 – 50	5×10^{2} – 5×10^{5}
Pharmaceuticals	10 – 10^{3}	25 – 100	2.5×10^{2} – 10^{5}

It highlights the waste produced in the process as opposed to the reaction, thus helping those who try to fulfil one of the twelve principles of green chemistry to avoid waste production. E-factors can be combined to assess multi-step reactions step by step or in one calculation. E-factors ignore recyclable factors such as recycled solvents and re-used catalysts, which obviously increases the accuracy but ignores the energy involved in the recovery (these are often included theoretically by assuming 90% solvent recovery). The main difficulty with E-factors is the need to define system boundaries, for example, which stages of the production or product life-cycle to consider before calculations can be made.

This metric is simple to apply industrially, as a production facility can measure how much material enters the site and how much leaves as product and waste, thereby directly giving an accurate global E-factor for the site. Sheldon's analyses (see table) demonstrate that oil companies produce less waste than pharmaceuticals as a percentage of material processed. This reflects the fact that the profit margins in the oil industry require them to minimise waste and find uses for products which would normally be discarded as waste. By contrast the pharmaceutical sector is more focused on molecule manufacture and quality. The (currently) high profit margins within the sector mean that there is less concern about the comparatively large amounts of waste that are produced (especially considering the volumes used). Despite the percentage waste and E-factor being high, the pharmaceutical section produces much lower tonnage of waste than any other sector. This table encouraged a number of large pharmaceutical companies to commence “green” chemistry programs.

== The EcoScale ==
The EcoScale metric was proposed in 2006 for evaluation of the effectiveness of a synthetic reaction. It is characterized by simplicity and general applicability. Like the yield-based scale, the EcoScale gives a score from 0 to 100, but also takes into account cost, safety, technical set-up, energy and purification aspects. It is obtained by assigning a value of 100 to an ideal reaction defined as "Compound A (substrate) undergoes a reaction with (or in the presence of)inexpensive compound(s) B to give the desired compound C in 100% yield at room temperature with a minimal risk for the operator and a minimal impact on the environment", and then subtracting penalty points for non-ideal conditions. These penalty points take into account both the advantages and disadvantages of specific reagents, set-ups and technologies.
