= Dry media reaction =

A dry media reaction or solid-state reaction or solventless reaction is a chemical reaction performed in the absence of a solvent. Dry media reactions have been developed in the wake of developments in microwave chemistry, and are a part of green chemistry.

The drive for the development of dry media reactions in chemistry is:

- economics (save money on solvents)
- ease of purification (no solvent removal post-synthesis)
- high reaction rate (due to high concentration of reactants)
- environmentally friendly (solvent is not required), see green chemistry

Drawbacks to overcome:

- reactants should mix to a homogeneous system
- high viscosity in reactant system
- unsuitable for solvent assisted chemical reactions
- problems with dissipating heat safely; risk of thermal runaway
- side reactions accelerated
- if reagents are solids, very high energy consumption from milling

In one type of solventless reaction a liquid reactant is used neat, for instance the reaction of 1-bromonaphthalene with Lawesson's reagent is done with no added liquid solvent, but the 1-bromonaphthalene acts as a solvent.

A reaction which is closer to a true solventless reaction is a Knoevenagel condensation of ketones with (malononitrile) where a 1:1 mixture of the two reactants (and ammonium acetate) is irradiated in a microwave oven.

Colin Raston's research group have been responsible for a number of new solvent free reactions. In some of these reactions all the starting materials are solids, they are ground together with some sodium hydroxide to form a liquid, which turns into a paste which then hardens to a solid.

In another development the two components of an aldol reaction are combined with the asymmetric catalyst S-proline in a ball mill in a mechanosynthesis. The reaction product has 97% enantiomeric excess.

A reaction rate acceleration is observed in several systems when a homogeneous solvent system is rapidly evaporated in a rotavap in a vacuum, one of them a Wittig reaction. The reaction goes to completion in 5 minutes with immediate evaporation whereas the same reaction in solution after the same 5 minutes (dichloromethane) has only 70% conversion and even after 24 hours some of the aldehyde remains.
