= Green Chemistry Letters and Reviews =

- Discipline: Chemistry, chemical engineering
- Language: English
- Edited by: Anja-Verena Mudring

Publication details
- History: 2007–present
- Publisher: Taylor & Francis
- Frequency: Quarterly
- Open access: Open access
- Impact factor: 4.990 (2020)

Standard abbreviations
- ISO 4: Green Chem. Lett. Rev.

Indexing
- ISSN: 1751-8253 (print); 1751-7192 (web)

Links
- Journal homepage

Green Chemistry Letters and Reviews is a peer-reviewed scientific journal published quarterly by Taylor & Francis. It publishes full papers and review articles on new syntheses and green chemistry.
