= Paul Anastas =

American chemist (born 1962)

Paul T. Anastas
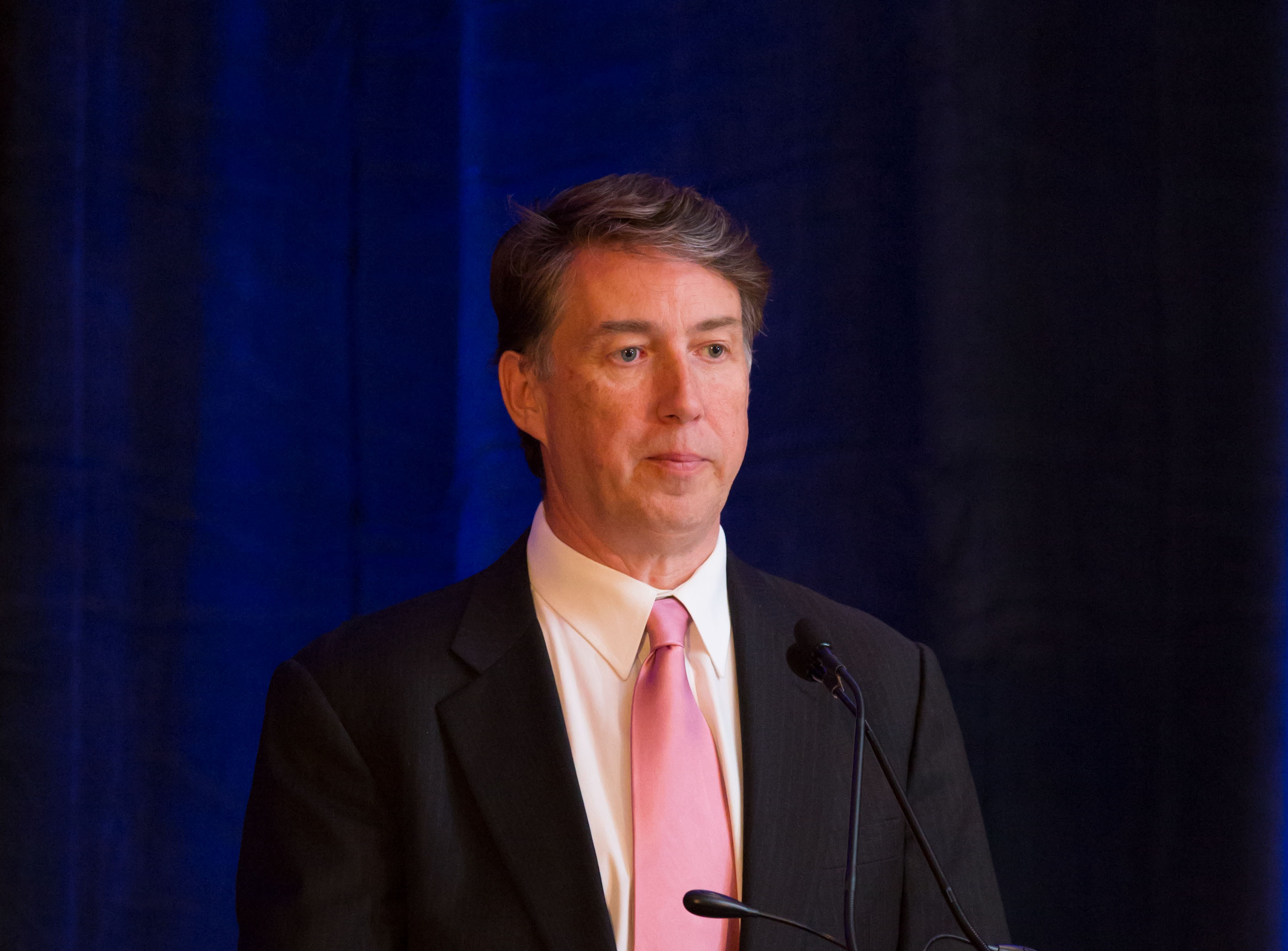

Assistant Administrator of the Environmental Protection Agency for Research and Development
- In office 2009–2012
- President: Barack Obama

Personal details
- Born: May 16, 1962 (age 64) Quincy, Massachusetts, U.S.
- Spouse: Julie Zimmerman (m. 2006)
- Education: University of Massachusetts Boston; Brandeis University

Paul T. Anastas (born May 16, 1962, in Quincy, Massachusetts) is an American scientist, inventor, author, entrepreneur, professor, and public servant. Paul Anastas is widely regarded as the "Father of Green Chemistry." He is the Program Director of the Green Chemistry Initiative at the Gordon and Betty Moore Foundation. In 2007 he co-founded the Yale University's Center for Green Chemistry and Green Engineering. Previously he served as the Science Advisor to the United States Environmental Protection Agency as well as the Agency's Assistant Administrator for Research and Development, appointed by President Barack Obama.

== Career ==
Anastas is known widely for his work on the design and manufacture of chemicals that are non-hazardous and environmentally benign. He is also a champion of sustainability science and innovation for environmental protection.

Anastas has brought worldwide attention to the power of molecular design to help the environment. He has published scores of articles as well as fifteen books, including his seminal work with co-author John Warner, Green Chemistry: Theory and Practice. Their 12 Principles of Green Chemistry are the basis for high school, college and graduate programs around the world and have significantly altered the landscape of the chemicals industry in the United States and other countries.

Anastas began his career as a staff chemist at the EPA, where he coined the term "Green Chemistry" and launched the field's first research program. He went on to co-found the Green Chemistry Institute in 1997 at the American Chemical Society and served in the White House Office of Science and Technology Policy from 1999 to 2004, where he concluded service as Assistant Director for the Environment. Anastas returned to EPA in 2009 as the Assistant Administrator for EPA's Office of Research and Development (ORD) and the Science Advisor to the Agency, resigning from those positions in February 2012 to return to Yale and his family. In his role as Assistant Administrator, he worked to engage scientists, engineers, and stakeholders across EPA, the federal government, and the scientific community to unify around the common goal of sustainability. He co-founded the chemical manufacturing company, P2 Science in 2011, the catalysis company, Catalytic Innovations in 2017, and Inkemia Green Chemicals in 2017. Anastas is currently on leave from Yale where he was the Director of Yale University's Center for Green Chemistry and Green Engineering, where he holds the Theresa and H. John Heinz chair in Chemistry for the Environment.

== Early life ==
Anastas was born and raised in Quincy, Massachusetts. He developed an interest in science and environmental issues after witnessing the wetlands behind his childhood home get bulldozed and destroyed for a development project. When he was nine years old he received an “Award of Excellence” from President Richard Nixon for his “outstanding achievements in environmental protection” for his essay on the founding of the U.S. Environmental Protection Agency. As a teenager in Quincy, Anastas met and developed a close friendship with fellow green chemist John Warner. The pair have since co-authored several scientific papers and books, including the 12 Principles of Green Chemistry. Anastas retains a noticeable Boston accent and is a devoted fan of his hometown baseball team, the Boston Red Sox.

He is trained as a synthetic organic chemist. He earned his B.S. in chemistry from the University of Massachusetts Boston and his M.A. and Ph.D. in chemistry from Brandeis University.

== Press ==
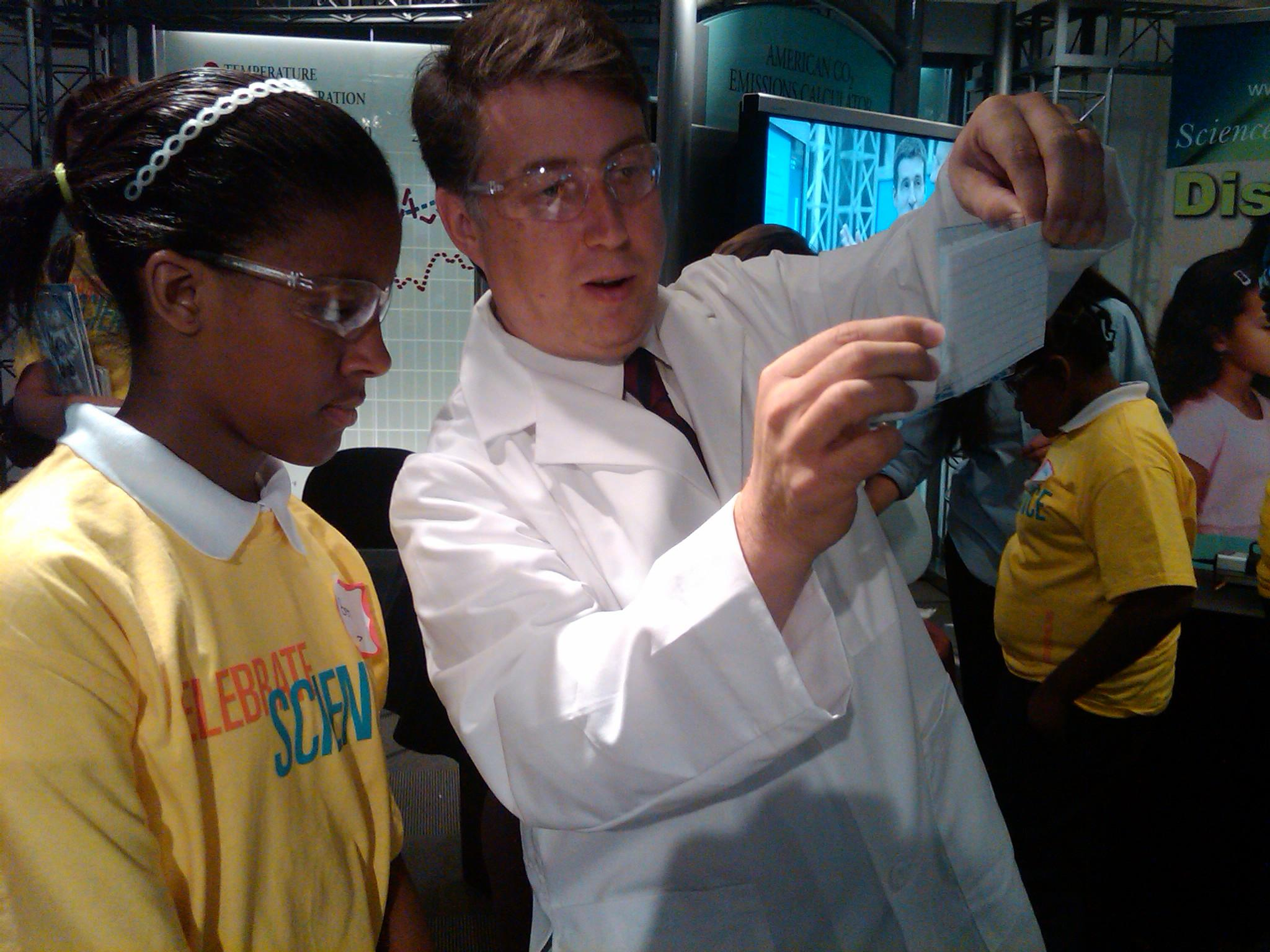
Paul Anastas instructing a student at the Koshland Science Museum. Washington DC, 2010.

Anastas and his work have been featured in several popular media outlets, including:

- Chemical & Engineering News: Paul Anastas and His Crew are Coming to Green Up Your World
- The New York Times: Green Chemistry Guru Charting New Course at EPA
- WHYY Radio Times: Paul T. Anastas the Father of Green Chemistry
- Nature: Chemistry: It's Not Easy Being Green
- Yale Scientific: Paul Anastas: A Power Player in the Global Chemical Industry
- Living on Earth: Sustainable Science at EPA
- Market Place: EPA Scientist Advocates Green Chemistry
- Chemical & Engineering News: Mr. Sustainability Goes to Washington

== Public speaking ==
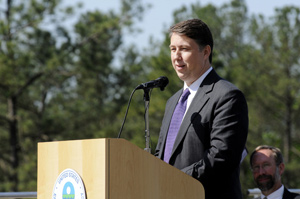
Paul Anastas speaking on Earth Day. April, 2010

Anastas is known for delivering energetic, engaging public talks that challenge audience members to think differently about environmental challenges. His speeches have been called "thought provoking", "inspiring", and "optimistic". He has been featured as a keynote speaker at several prestigious meetings, conferences and events, including:

- The American College and University President's Climate Commitment Summit
- The Joseph Priestley Lecture at the Chemical Heritage Foundation
- The United Nations Commission on Sustainable Development Roundtable
- The Albemarle Lecture on Sustainability at Louisiana State University
- The State of Green Business Forum
- The Distinguished Borlaug Lecture at NC State University

== Awards ==
Anastas has been recognized for his work with several awards, including:

- 2021: Volvo Environmental Prize
- 2018: Honorary Doctorate of Science, University of Massachusetts Boston, US
- 2017: US Environmental Protection Agency Lifetime Achievement Award
- 2017: Italian Chemical Society, Silver Seal Medal
- 2017: Sigma Xi Distinguished Lecturer
- 2016: Association of Environmental Engineering and Science Professors, Frontier in Research Award
- 2016: Royal Society of Chemistry, Green Chemistry Award
- 2016: Honorary Doctorate of Science in chemistry, McGill University, Montreal, Canada
- 2015: Emanuel Merck Lectureship Prize
- 2012: Wöhler Prize, Gesellschaft Deutscher Chemiker (GDCh)
- 2012: Edward O. Wilson Biodiversity Technology Pioneer Award
- 2012: Brandeis University Alumni Achievement Award
- 2011: The Rachel Carson Environmental Award from the Natural Products Association
- 2008: The Annual Leadership in Science Award (with John Warner) from the Council of Scientific Society Presidents
- 2007: The John Jeyes Award from the Royal Society of Chemistry
- 2006: The 12th Annual Heinz Award for the Environment
- 2005: The Scientific American 50 Award for Policy Innovation
- 2004: The Inaugural Canadian Green Chemistry Award
- 2002: The Greek Chemical Society Award for Contributions to Chemistry
- 2001: Recognized by President George W. Bush for “Distinguished Service on September 11, 2001” noting his “dedicated service to the White House and the Executive Office of the President following the attack on the United States of America” while he was serving in the White House Office of Science and Technology Policy.
- 1999: The Nolan Sommer Award for Distinguished Contributions to Chemistry
- 1999: The Joseph Seifter Award for Scientific Excellence
- 1998: The Vice President's Hammer Award for reinventing government recognizing his work in establishing the U.S. Green Chemistry Program.
- 1991: President H.W. Bush’s Point-of-Light Award for volunteer service

Anastas was a special professor at the University of Nottingham and an honorary professor at Queens University of Belfast where he was also awarded an honorary doctorate.
