= Heroes of Chemistry =

- Awarded for: recognizes teams responsible for the development of innovative, impactful products based on chemistry
- Sponsored by: American Chemical Society
- Date: 1996
- Presented by: American Chemical Society
- Website: http://www.acs.org/content/acs/en/funding-and-awards/awards/industry/heroes.html

The Heroes of Chemistry is an award given annually by the American Chemical Society. It highlights teams responsible for creation of innovative and impactful products based on chemistry and chemical engineering and is intended to show how human welfare is improved by industrial chemical scientists and their companies.

The Heroes of Chemistry was first awarded in 1996. Multiple awards are given yearly. The award has recognized products from a variety of companies and a variety of fields. Winners include pharmaceuticals, agricultural chemicals, zeolites, chemical processes, and polymers. The award has evolved over time. In early years, many individuals were named based on a body of work. More recently, the award has been granted to development teams responsible for commercialized products.

== See also ==
- List of chemistry awards
