= Regulation and monitoring of pollution =

To protect the environment from the adverse effects of pollution, many nations worldwide have enacted legislation to regulate various types of pollution as well as to mitigate the adverse effects of pollution. At the local level, regulation usually is supervised by environmental agencies or the broader public health system. Jurisdictions often have different levels regulation and policy choices about pollution. Historically, polluters will lobby governments in less economically developed areas or countries to maintain lax regulation to protect industrialisation at the cost of human and environmental health.

The modern environmental regulatory environment has its origins in the United States with the beginning of industrial regulations around Air and Water pollution connected to industry and mining during the 1960s and 1970s.

Because many pollutants have transboundary impacts, the UN and other treaty bodies have been used to regulate pollutants that circulate as air pollution, water pollution or trade in wastes. Early international agreements were successful at addressing Global Environmental issues, such as Montreal Protocol, which banned Ozone depleting chemicals in 1987, with more recent agreements focusing on broader, more widely dispersed chemicals such as persistent organic pollutants in the Stockholm Convention on Persistent Organic Pollutants created in 2001, such as PCBs, and the Kyoto Protocol in 1997 which initiated collaboration on addressing greenhouse gases to mitigate climate change. Governments, NPOs, research groups, and citizen scientists monitor pollution with an expanding list of low-cost pollution monitoring tools.

== Regulation and monitoring by region ==
=== International ===
Since pollution crosses political boundaries, international treaties have been made through the United Nations and its agencies to address international pollution issues.

==== Greenhouse gas emissions ====
The Kyoto Protocol is an amendment to the United Nations Framework Convention on Climate Change (UNFCCC), an international treaty on global warming. It also reaffirms sections of the UNFCCC. Countries which ratify this protocol commit to reduce their emissions of carbon dioxide and five other greenhouse gases, or engage in emissions trading if they maintain or increase emissions of these gases. A total of 141 countries have ratified the agreement. Notable exceptions include the United States and Australia, who have signed but not ratified the agreement. The stated reason for the United States not ratifying is the exemption of large emitters of greenhouse gases who are also developing countries, like China and India. A [007 United Nations Climate Change Conference|UN environmental conference] held in [ali 3–14 December 2007 with the participation of 180 countries, aiming to replace the Kyoto Protocol, which will end in 2012. During the first day of the conference United States, Saudi Arabia, and [anada]] were presented with the "Fossil-of-the-day award", a symbolic bag of coal for their negative impact on the global climate. The bags included the flags of the respective countries.

=== Canada ===
In Canada, the regulation of pollution and its effects are monitored by several organizations, depending on the nature of the pollution and its location. The three levels of government (federal; Canada-wide, Provincial, and Municipal) equally share in the responsibilities and the monitoring and correction of pollution.

=== China ===
China's rapid industrialization has substantially increased pollution. China has some relevant regulations: the 1979 Environmental Protection Law, which was largely modeled on U.S. legislation, but the environment continues to deteriorate. Twelve years after the law, only one Chinese city was making an effort to clean up its water discharges. This indicates that China is about 30 years behind the U.S. schedule of environmental regulation and 10 to 20 years behind Europe. In July 2007, it was reported that the World Bank reluctantly censored a report revealing that 750,000 people in China die every year as a result of pollution-related diseases. China's State Environment Protection Agency and the Health Ministry asked the World Bank to cut the calculations of premature deaths from the report fearing the revelation would provoke "social unrest".

=== Europe ===
The basic European rules are included in the Directive 96/61/EC of 24 September 1996 concerning integrated pollution prevention and control (IPPC) and the National Emission Ceilings Directive.

==== United Kingdom ====
In the 1840s, the United Kingdom enacted legislation to control water pollution, which was strengthened in 1876 in the Rivers Pollution Prevention Act. The law was extended to all freshwaters in the Rivers (Prevention of Pollution) Act 1951 and applied to coastal waters by the Rivers (Prevention of Pollution) Act 1961.

The Environmental Protection Act of 1990 established the system of Integrated Pollution Control (IPC). Currently, the cleanup of historic contamination is controlled under a specific statutory scheme found in Part IIA of the Environmental Protection Act 1996 (Part IIA), as inserted by the Environment Act 1995, and other rules found in regulations and statutory guidance. The Act came into force in England in April 2000.

Within the current regulatory framework, Pollution Prevention and Control (PPC) is a regime for controlling pollution from certain designated industrial activities. The regime introduces the concept of Best Available Techniques (BAT) to environmental regulations. Operators must use the BAT to control pollution from their industrial activities to prevent, and where that is not practicable, to reduce to acceptable levels, pollution to air, land and water from industrial activities. The Best Available Techniques also aim to balance the cost to the operator against the benefits to the environment.

The system of Pollution Prevention and Control is replacing that of IPC and has been taking effect between 2000 and 2007. The Pollution Prevention and Control regime implements the European Directive (EC/96/61) on integrated pollution prevention and control.

=== United States ===
==== Pollution prevention ====
Pollution prevention (P2) is a strategy for reducing the amount of waste created and released into the environment, particularly by industrial facilities, agriculture, or consumers. Many large corporations view P2 as a method of improving the efficiency and profitability of production processes through waste reduction and technology advancements. Legislative bodies have enacted P2 measures, such as the Pollution Prevention Act of 1990 and the Clean Air Act Amendments of 1990 in the United States Congress.

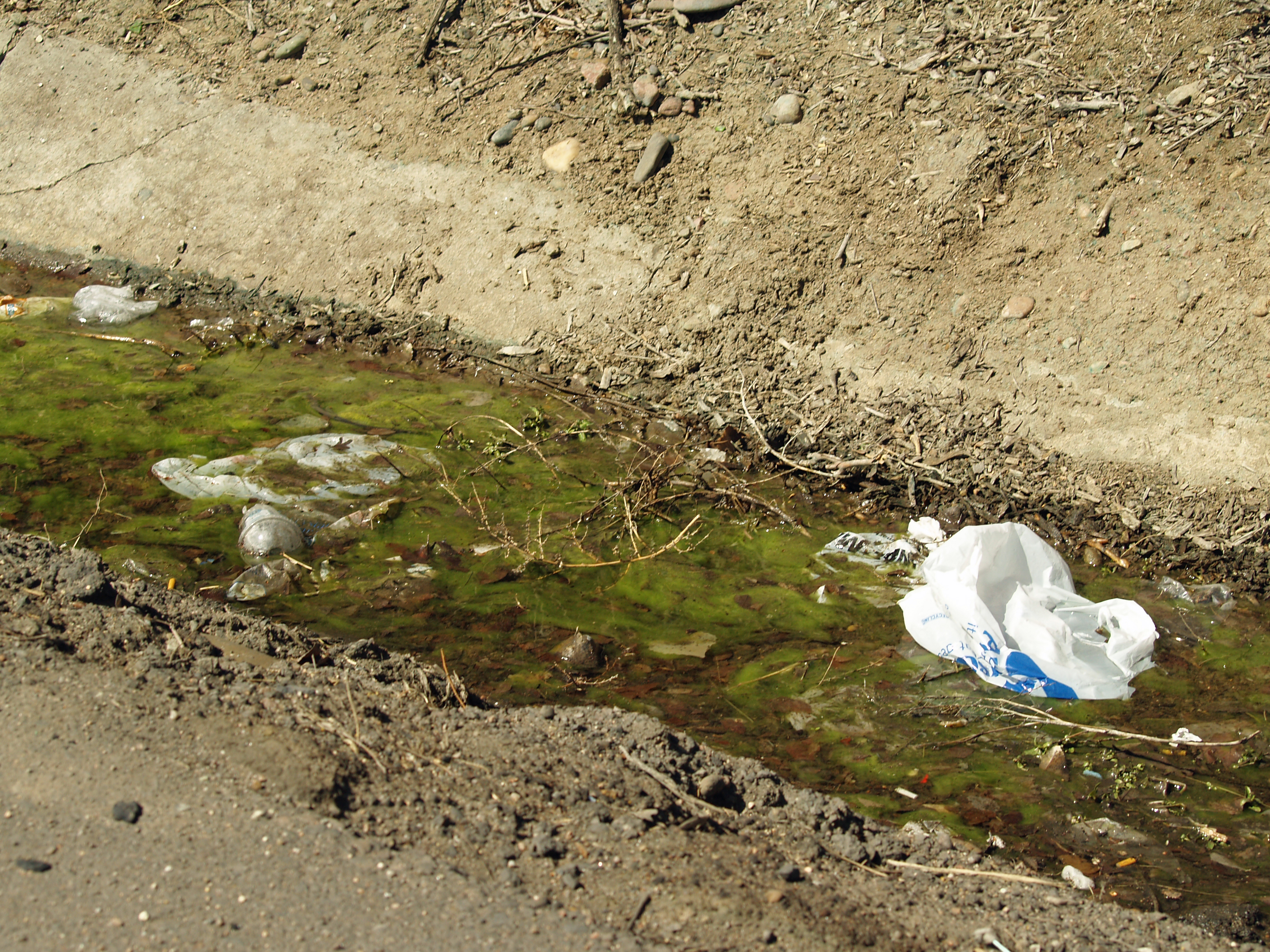
A polluted ditch along Interstate 25 between Colorado Springs and Pueblo, Colorado

==== Air pollution ====
Congress passed the Clean Air Act in 1963, requiring the reduction of smog and atmospheric pollution in general. The law was amended in 1966, 1970, 1977 and 1990. Pursuant to the legislation, the US Public Health Service published a list of emission factors in 1968, with periodic updates published by the US Environmental Protection Agency (EPA). Numerous state and local governments have enacted similar legislation either implementing or filling in locally important gaps in the national program. The national Clean Air Act and similar state legislative acts have led to the widespread use of atmospheric dispersion modeling to analyze the air quality impacts of proposed major actions. Under the 1990 Clean Air Act amendments, EPA initiated a carbon emissions trading system in which tradable rights to emit a specified level of carbon are granted to polluters.

==== Water pollution ====
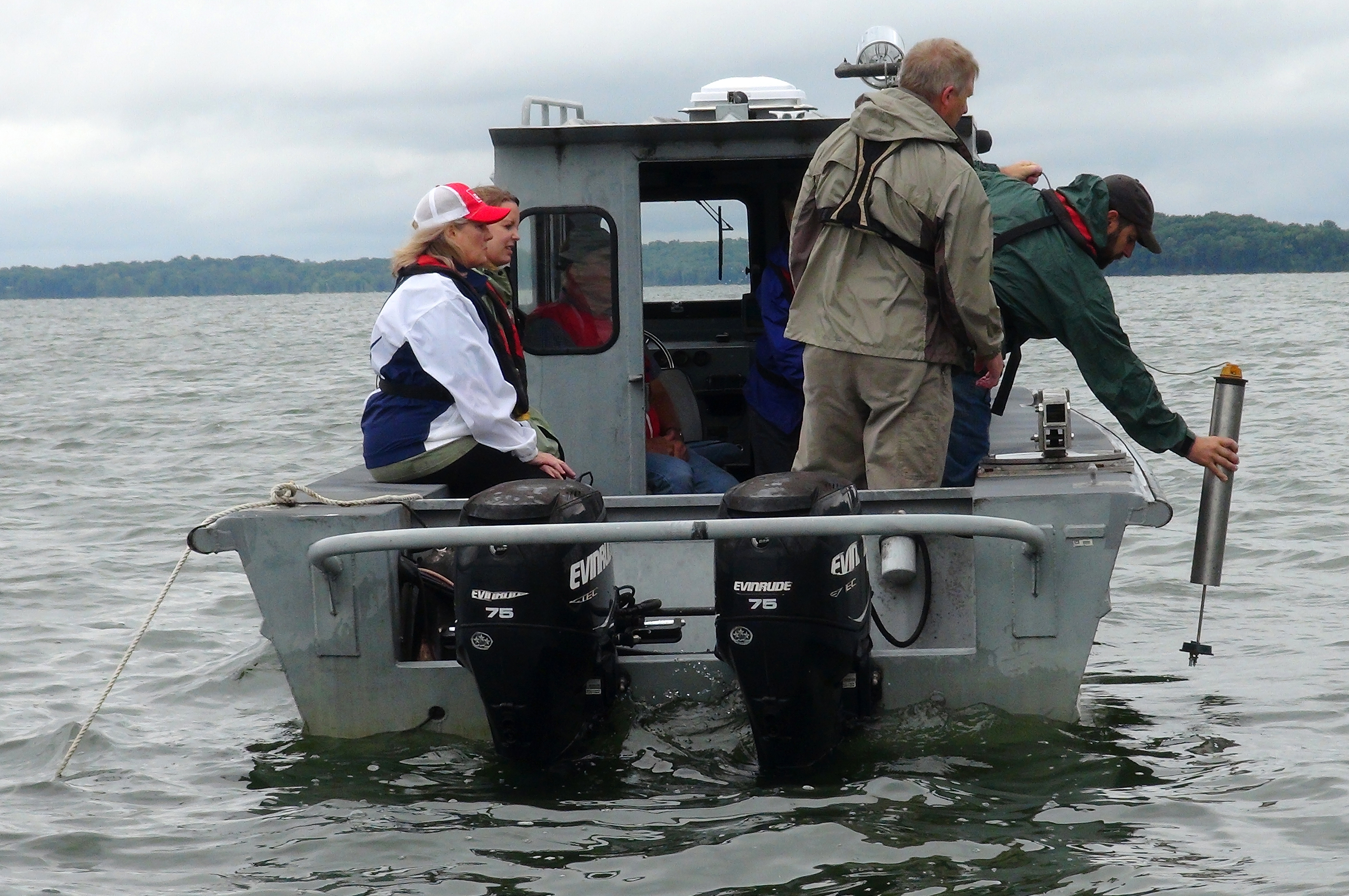
Ambient water sample collection on a lake in Nashville, Tennessee

Enactment of the 1972 Clean Water Act (CWA) required thousands of facilities to obtain permits for discharges to navigable water bodies through the National Pollutant Discharge Elimination System (NPDES). It also required EPA to establish national technology-based discharge standards for municipal sewage treatment plants, and for many industrial categories (the latter are called "effluent guidelines.")

Municipal and industrial permittees are required to regularly collect and analyze wastewater samples, and submit Discharge Monitoring Reports to a state agency or EPA. Amendments in 1977 required stricter regulation of toxic pollutants. In 1987, Congress expanded NPDES permit coverage to include municipal and industrial stormwater discharges.

The Act also requires the use of best management practices for a wide range of other water discharges, including nonpoint source pollution.

Thermal pollution discharges are regulated under section 316(a) of the CWA. NPDES permits include effluent limitations on water temperature to protect the biotic life supported by a water body. A permittee may request a variance to the typical thermal limitations. Alternate limitations may be issued in limited circumstances if the permittee has provided sufficient proof through data submission that aquatic life in the water body will be protected.

In addition to wastewater discharge monitoring, EPA works with federal, state and local environmental agencies to conduct ambient water monitoring programs in water bodies nationwide. The CWA requires the EPA and the states to prepare reports to Congress on the condition of the nation's waters. Ambient water quality data collected by EPA, the US Geological Survey and other organizations are available to the public in several online databases.

==== Land pollution ====
Congress passed the Resource Conservation and Recovery Act (RCRA) in 1976, which created a regulatory framework for both municipal solid waste and hazardous waste disposed on land. RCRA requires that all hazardous wastes be managed and tracked from generation of the waste, through transport and processing, to final disposal, using a nationwide permit system. The Hazardous and Solid Waste Amendments of 1984 mandated regulation of underground storage tanks containing petroleum and hazardous chemicals, and the phasing out of land disposal of hazardous waste. The 1992 Federal Facilities Compliance Act clarified RCRA coverage of federally owned properties such as military bases. Illegal disposal of waste is punishable by fines of up to $25,000 per occurrence. EPA and state agencies regulate contaminated sites and facilities under RCRA for operating facilities, and the "Superfund" law for abandoned facilities.

To specifically mitigate soil pollution from fertilizers, the U.S. Natural Resources Conservation Service (NRCS), National Institute of Food and Agriculture (NIFA), and Agricultural Research Service (ARS) monitor soil resources and provide guidelines to prevent nutrient loss.

==== Noise pollution ====
Passage of the Noise Control Act in 1972 established mechanisms of setting emission standards for virtually every source of noise including motor vehicles, aircraft, certain types of HVAC equipment and major appliances. It also put local government on notice as to their responsibilities in land use planning to address noise mitigation. This noise regulation framework comprised a broad database detailing the extent of noise health effects. Congress ended the funding of the federal noise control program in 1981, which curtailed the development of further national regulations.

==== Light pollution ====
Light pollution in the United States is not federally regulated. At least 19 states and one territory have implemented laws that regulate light pollution to some extent.

State legislation includes restrictions on hardware, protective equipment, and net light pollution ratings. Such legislation has been coined "Dark Skies" Legislation. States have implemented light pollution regulation for many factors, including public safety, energy conservation, improved astronomy research, and reduced environmental effects.

==== Consumer product labeling ====
The state of California Office of Environmental Health Hazard Assessment (OEHHA) has maintained an independent list of substances with product labeling requirements as required by Proposition 65 since 1986. The state law is intended to protect drinking water sources from toxic substances that cause cancer or birth defects and to reduce or eliminate exposures to those chemicals generally.

==== Research ====
The Toxicology and Environmental Health Information Program (TEHIP) at the United States National Library of Medicine (NLM) maintains a comprehensive toxicology and environmental health web site that includes access to resources produced by TEHIP and by other government agencies and organizations. This website includes links to databases, bibliographies, tutorials, and other scientific and consumer-oriented resources. TEHIP is also responsible for the Toxicology Data Network (TOXNET), an integrated system of toxicology and environmental health databases that are available free of charge on the web.

TOXMAP is a Geographic Information System (GIS) that is part of TOXNET. TOXMAP uses maps of the United States to help users visually explore data from the EPA Toxics Release Inventory and Superfund Basic Research Programs.

== See also ==
- Greenhouse gas monitoring
- List of environmental issues
- Dutch standards, environmental pollutant reference values
- Timeline of major US environmental and occupational health regulation
