= Waste hierarchy =

Tool to evaluate processes protecting the environment

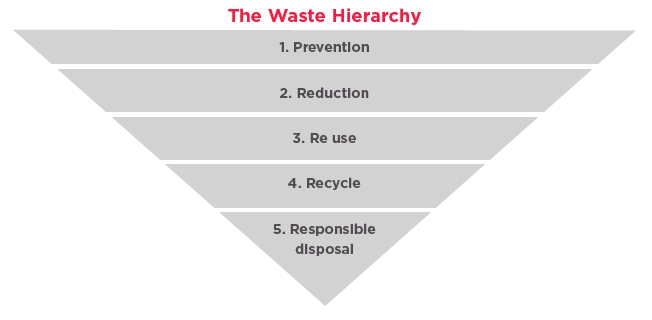
The waste management hierarchy starts from prevention and reduction actions.

Enhanced version of waste hierarchy

The three chasing arrows of the international recycling symbol. It is sometimes accompanied by the text "reduce, reuse and recycle".

The waste management hierarchy, waste hierarchy, or "hierarchy of waste management options", is a tool used in the evaluation of processes that protect the environment alongside resource and energy consumption from most favourable to least favourable actions. The hierarchy establishes preferred program priorities based on sustainability. To be sustainable, waste management cannot be solved only with technical end-of-pipe solutions and an integrated approach is necessary.

The hierarchy indicates an order of preference for action to reduce and manage waste, and is usually presented diagrammatically in the form of a pyramid. The hierarchy captures the progression of a material or product through successive stages of waste management, and represents the latter part of the life-cycle for each product.

The aim of the waste hierarchy is to extract the maximum practical benefits from products and to generate the minimum amount of waste. The proper application of the waste hierarchy can have several benefits. It can help prevent emissions of greenhouse gases, reduce pollutants, save energy, conserve resources, create jobs and stimulate the development of green technologies.

== Life-cycle thinking ==
All products and services have environmental impacts, from the extraction of raw materials for production to manufacture, distribution, use and disposal. Following the waste hierarchy will generally lead to the most resource-efficient and environmentally sound choice but in some cases refining decisions within the hierarchy or departing from it can lead to better environmental outcomes.

Life cycle thinking and assessment can be used to support decision-making in the area of waste management and to identify the best environmental options. It can help policy makers understand the benefits and trade-offs they have to face when making decisions on waste management strategies. Life-cycle assessment provides an approach to ensure that the best outcome for the environment can be identified and put in place. It involves looking at all stages of a product's life to find where improvements can be made to reduce environmental impacts and improve the use or reuse of resources. A key goal is to avoid actions that shift negative impacts from one stage to another. Life cycle thinking can be applied to the five stages of the waste management hierarchy.

For example, life-cycle analysis has shown that it is often better for the environment to replace an old washing machine, despite the waste generated, than to continue to use an older machine which is less energy-efficient. This is because a washing machine's greatest environmental impact is during its use phase. Buying an energy-efficient machine and using low-temperature detergent reduce environmental impacts.

The European Union Waste Framework Directive has introduced the concept of life-cycle thinking into waste policies. This duality approach gives a broader view of all environmental aspects and ensures any action has an overall benefit compared to other options. The actions to deal with waste along the hierarchy should be compatible with other environmental initiatives.

== European Union ==
The European waste hierarchy refers to the five steps included in the article 4 of the Waste Framework Directive:

Prevention
preventing and reducing waste generation.
Reuse and preparation for reuse
giving the products a second life before they become waste. This might involve reusing the product as-is, or reuse with modification, such as repurposing, refurbishing and remanufacture.
Recycle
any recovery operation by which waste materials are reprocessed into products, materials or substances whether for the original or other purposes. It includes composting and it does not include incineration.
Recovery
some waste incineration that upgrades the less inefficient incinerators.
Disposal
processes to dispose of waste be it landfilling, incineration, pyrolysis, gasification and other finalist solutions.

According to the Waste Framework Directive the European Waste Hierarchy is legally binding except in cases that may require specific waste streams to depart from the hierarchy. This should be justified on the basis of life-cycle thinking.

== History ==
The waste hierarchy is a concept of environmental literature and some EU member-states environmental legislation but before the [waste framework directive] of 2008 was not part of the European legislation. The waste framework directive of 1975 had no reference to a waste hierarchy.

In 1975, The European Union's Waste Framework Directive (1975/442/EEC) introduced for the first time the elements of the waste hierarchy concept into European waste policy. It emphasized the importance of waste minimization, and the protection of the environment and human health, as a priority. Following the 1975 Directive, European Union policy and legislation adapted to the principles of the waste hierarchy.

Fundamental to the waste hierarchy concept is "Lansink's Ladder", named after the Member of the Dutch Parliament, Ad Lansink, who proposed it in 1979 to be incorporated into Dutch policy in 1993.

In 1989, it was formalized into a hierarchy of management options in the European Commission's Community Strategy for Waste Management and this waste strategy was further endorsed in the Commission's review in 1996.

In the first legislative proposals of 2006 the European Commission suggested a 3-step hierarchy composed of 1- Prevention and Reuse, 2- Recycling and Recovery (with incineration) and 3- Disposal. This was heavily criticised because it was putting recycling at the same level of incineration which was coherent with the traditional pro-incineration position from the European Commission. The pressure from NGOs and member states managed to turn the initial non-binding 3-step hierarchy into a quasi-binding 5-step hierarchy.

In 2008, the European Union introduced a new five-step waste hierarchy to its waste legislation, Directive 2008/98/EC, which member states must introduce into national waste management laws. Article 4 of the directive lays down a five-step hierarchy of waste management options which must be applied by Member States in this priority order. Waste prevention, as the preferred option, is followed by reuse, recycling, recovery including energy recovery and as a last option, safe disposal. Among engineers, a similar hierarchy of waste management has been known as ARRE strategy: avoid, reduce, recycle, eliminate.

== Challenges for local and regional authorities ==
The task of implementing the waste hierarchy in waste management practices within a country may be delegated to the different levels of government (national, regional, local) and to other possible factors including industry, private companies and households. Local and regional authorities can be particularly challenged by the following issues when applying the waste hierarchy approach.

- A coherent waste management strategy must be set up
- Separate collection and sorting systems for many different waste streams need to be established.
- Adequate treatment and disposal facilities must be established.
- An effective horizontal co-operation between local authorities and municipalities and a vertical co-operation between the different levels of government, local to regional and when beneficial, also at the national level need to established
- Finding financing for the establishing or upgrading of expensive sustainable waste management infrastructure to address the needs of managing waste
- A lack of data available on waste management strategies must be overcome and monitoring requirements must be met to implement the waste programs
- The enforcement and control of business plans and practices be established and applied to maximize benefits to the environment and human health
- A lack of administrative capacity at the regional and local level. The lack of finances, information, and technical expertise must be overcome for effective implementation and success of the waste management policies.

== Source reduction ==
Source reduction involves efforts to reduce hazardous waste and other materials by modifying industrial production. Source reduction methods involve changes in manufacturing technology, raw material inputs, and product formulation. At times, the term "pollution prevention" may refer to source reduction.

Another method of source reduction is to increase incentives for recycling. Many communities in the United States are implementing variable-rate pricing for waste disposal (also known as Pay As You Throw - PAYT) which has been effective in reducing the size of the municipal waste stream.

Source reduction is typically measured by efficiencies and cutbacks in waste. Toxics use reduction is a more controversial approach to source reduction that targets and measures reductions in the upstream use of toxic materials. Toxic use reduction emphasizes the more preventive aspects of source reduction but, due to its emphasis on toxic chemical inputs, has been opposed more vigorously by chemical manufacturers. Toxic use reduction programs have been set up by legislation in some states, e.g., Massachusetts, New Jersey, and Oregon.

== See also ==
- Circular economy – Production model to minimise wastage and emissions
- Directorate-General for the Environment – Agency of the European Commission
- Durable good – Good that has long term use
- European Environment Agency – Agency of the European Union
- Green transport hierarchy – Prioritising vulnerable sustainable road users
- Life cycle thinking – Awareness of ongoing environmental impact
- Material passport – Supply chain document
- Mottainai – Japanese term translates as "What a waste!"
- Repair – Maintaining a device in working condition
- Repurposing – Using object intended for one purpose in alternative way
- Reuse – Using something again
- Sustainable products – Environmentally-beneficial products
