= Cleaner production =

Preventive, company-specific environmental protection initiative

Cleaner production is a preventive, company-specific environmental protection initiative. It is intended to minimize waste and emissions and maximize product output. By analysing the flow of materials and energy in a company, one tries to identify options to minimize waste and emissions out of industrial processes through source reduction strategies. Improvements in organisation and technology help reduce or suggest better choices in the use of materials and energy, and help avoid waste, wastewater generation, and gaseous emissions, as well as waste heat and noise.

== Overview ==
The concept was developed during the preparation of the Rio Summit as a programme of UNEP (United Nations Environmental Programme) and UNIDO (United Nations Industrial Development Organization) under the leadership of Jacqueline Aloisi de Larderel, the former Assistant Executive Director of UNEP. The programme was meant to reduce the environmental impact of industry. It built on ideas used by the company 3M in its 3P programme (pollution prevention pays). It has found more international support than all other comparable programmes. The programme idea was described "...to assist developing nations in leapfrogging from pollution to less pollution, using available technologies". Starting from the simple idea of producing with less waste Cleaner Production was developed into a concept to increase the resource efficiency of production in general. UNIDO has been operating National Cleaner Production Centers and Programmes (NCPCs/NCPPs) with centres in Latin America, Africa, Asia and Europe.

Cleaner production is endorsed by UNEP's International Declaration on Cleaner Production, "a voluntary and public statement of commitment to the practice and promotion of Cleaner Production". Implementing guidelines for cleaner production were published by UNEP in 2001.

In the US, the term pollution prevention is more commonly used for cleaner production.

== Options ==
Examples for cleaner production options are:

- Documentation of consumption (as a basic analysis of material and energy flows, e. g. with a Sankey diagram)
- Use of indicators and controlling (to identify losses from poor planning, poor education and training, mistakes)
- Substitution of raw materials and auxiliary materials (especially renewable materials and energy)
- Increase of useful life of auxiliary materials and process liquids (by avoiding drag-in, drag-out, contamination)
- Improved control and automatisation
- Reuse of waste (internal or external)
- New, low waste processes and technologies

== Initiatives ==
One of the first European initiatives in cleaner production was started in Austria in 1992 by the BMVIT (Bundesministerium für Verkehr, Innovation und Technologie). This resulted in two initiatives: "Prepare" and EcoProfit.

The "PIUS" initiative was founded in Germany in 1999. Since 1994, the United Nations Industrial Development Organization operates the National Cleaner Production Centre Programme with centres in Central America, South America, Africa, Asia, and Europe.

== See also ==
- Cradle-to-cradle design
- Energy conservation
- Environmental management
- Environmental Quality Management
- Green design
- Industrial ecology
- ISO 9001
- ISO 14001
- Source reduction)
- Sustainability
- Total quality management
- Waste minimisation
- Clean Production Agreement
