= GreenScreen List Translator =

Procedure for assessing chemical hazard

The GreenScreen List Translator is a procedure for assessing chemical hazard used to identify chemicals of concern to prioritize for removal from product formulations. The List Translator assesses substances based on their presence on lists of chemicals associated with human and environmental health hazards issued by a global set of governmental and professional scientific bodies, such as the European Union’s GHS hazard statements and California's Proposition 65.

== Analysis procedure ==
The List Translator procedure is defined in the GreenScreen for Safer Chemicals, a transparent, open standard for chemical hazard assessment that supports alternatives assessment for toxics use reduction through identifying chemicals of concern and safer alternatives. The GreenScreen protocol is published in a Guidance document that is reviewed and updated regularly. This description of the List Translator is based upon the Hazard Assessment Guidance Version 1.4

The List Translator identifies the hazard endpoints for which a substance has been listed on each of a defined set of published hazard lists and the level of hazard. It prioritizes for avoidance those substances listed with a high hazard of any of the following endpoints:

- Carcinogenicity
- Mutagenicity
- Reproductive toxicity
- Developmental toxicity
- Endocrine disruptor or
- Persistent, bioaccumulative and toxic substances (PBT).

This parallels the prioritization schemes underlying various international governmental regulatory programs such as the Substance of very high concern definition within the REACH Regulation of the European Union.

The central tools of the List Translator are the GreenScreen Specified Lists and the GreenScreen List Translator Map.

- GreenScreen Specified Lists: The List Translator identifies a set of lists as the references for the procedure. These are lists that identify specific chemicals or groups of chemicals that are associated with specific human and environmental health endpoints. The lists are published by a global set of state, national and international governmental bodies, such as the California Office of Environmental Health Hazard Assessment, the United States Environmental Protection Agency and the European Chemicals Agency. The Specified Lists also include lists published by scientific professional associations. In all cases there must be a defined set of threshold criteria and a review process by scientific authorities for listing
- GreenScreen List Translator Map: The Map characterizes each of the categories within each Specified List
  - The hazard endpoint(s) addressed by the list are identified and a hazard level or range is assigned. For example, the International Agency for Research on Cancer Monographs On the Evaluation of Carcinogenic Risks to Humans category of “Group 1 - Agent is Carcinogenic to humans” receives a “High” for Carcinogenicity. The List Translator characterizes the hazard level of substances from very low to very high across twenty human and environmental health endpoints addressing:
    - Human health - such as cancer and reproductive toxicity
    - Environmental protection - primarily aquatic toxicity
    - Physical hazard - flammability and reactivity
    - Environmental fate - persistence and bioaccumulation.
  - Lists are also characterized as
    - Authoritative - high confidence
    - Screening - lower confidence due to less comprehensive review, use of estimated data or other factors.
  - Authoritative lists and screening lists are both further characterized as:
    - A lists: contain single endpoint with one hazard classification or only one possible List Translator Score.
    - B lists: contain multiple endpoints and/or hazard classifications
  - A chemical receives an overall hazard level for each endpoint based on the highest hazard assigned by the most authoritative lists.

== List Translator scores ==
Scoring a substance is a three part procedure:

- Search the Specified Lists: Each of the Specified Lists is searched to determine if the substance being scored is listed on any of the lists. It may be identified specifically by CASRN or it may be a member of a listed compound group - a group of substances with a similar chemical structure.
- Compare the endpoints and hazard levels: The Map is consulted for each list on which the substance is identified to determine a hazard level for each endpoint. If there is more than one listing, the highest hazard level from the most authoritative list is used.
- Calculate List Translator score: The assigned hazard levels and endpoints are compared to the criteria for GreenScreen’s highest concern category of Benchmark 1:
  - LT-1 (List Translator Likely Benchmark 1) - The substance is on at least one Authoritative A list that meets Benchmark 1 criteria. That is, it meets the criteria for a high hazard carcinogen, mutagen, reproductive toxicant or developmental toxicant or endocrine disruptor or as a persistent bioaccumulative and toxic substance (PBT). The PBT criteria can be met by a combination of lists.
  - LT-P1 (List Translator Possible Benchmark 1) - On a list that overlaps Benchmark 1 criteria and/or is a lower confidence Authoritative B or Screening list.
  - LT-UNK (List Translator Benchmark Unknown) - Listed only on a list that does not meet or overlap Benchmark 1 criteria.
  - NoGSLT (No GreenScreen List Translator information) - Not listed on any of the GreenScreen Specified lists
  - NoGS (No GreenScreen information) - Not on any of the GreenScreen Specified lists and there is no public Greenscreen full assessment.

An LT-Unk, No GSLT or NoGS score is not an indication of low hazard or safety for a substance, only that the substance has not been listed for the priority health endpoints. A full GreenScreen Assessment must be undertaken to determine if the substance qualifies as an affirmatively safer substance.

== Automation ==
Any person can use the GreenScreen List Translator protocol to score a substance. The research required to look up the substance in each of the hazard lists is, however, substantial. Several Licensed GreenScreen List Translator™ Automators aggregate the lists and provide free online lookup services for determining List Translator scores.

== Applications ==
The GreenScreen List Translator is the first step in a GreenScreen Assessment. It is also used as a stand alone screening protocol by health and sustainability screening and certification programs. It is widely referenced in standards and certifications related to green building products, including the Health Product Declaration Standard (HPD), Portico, and the "Building product disclosure and optimization - material ingredients" credits in the US Green Building Council's LEED program.
