= Xylit =

Waste product generated by the mining of lignite

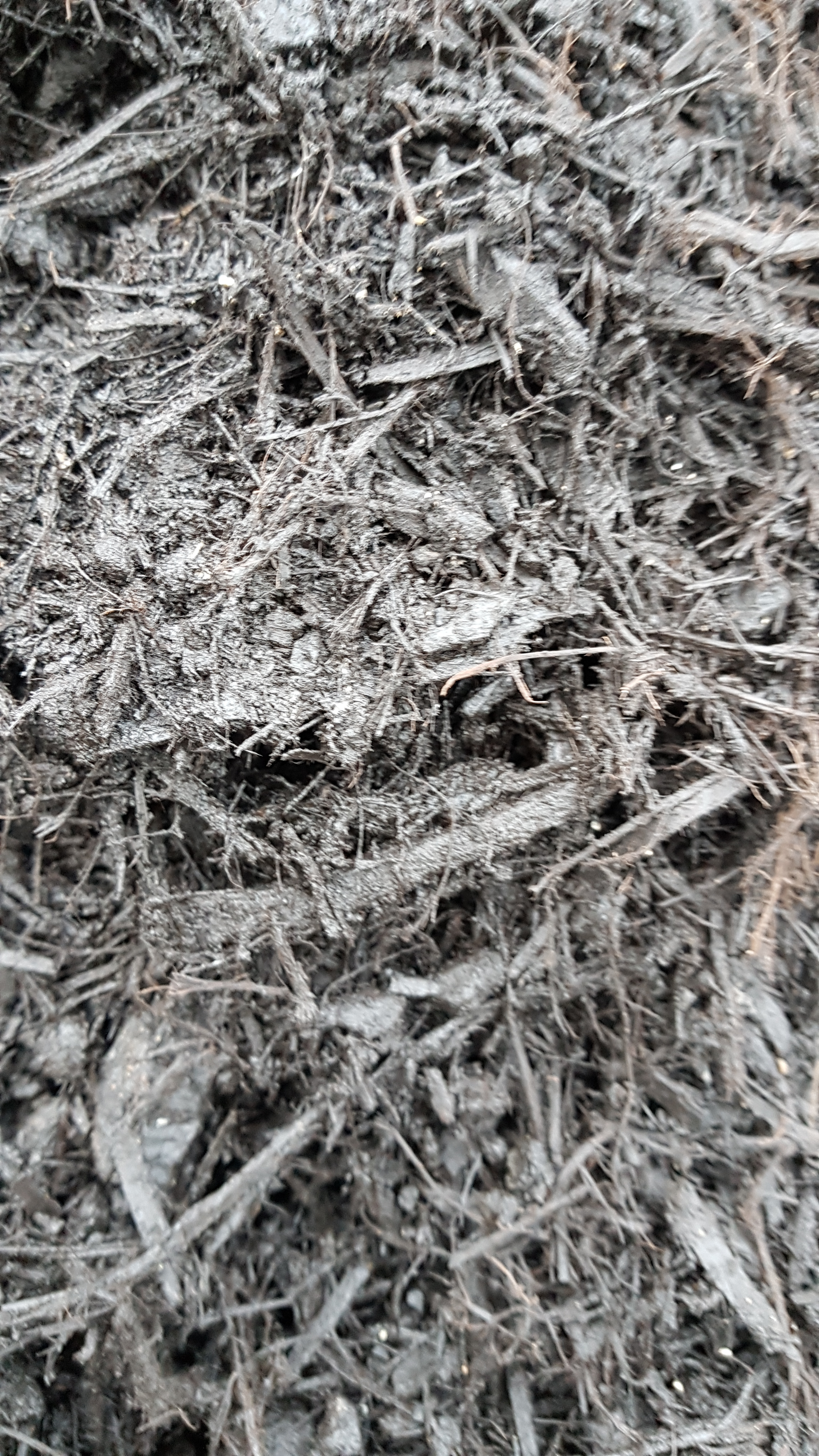
Xylit with wooden structures

Xylit (from xylon, "silk") is a waste product generated by the mining of lignite. As in peat, embedded iron structures do not become completely sedimented. Its density is around 250 kg/m^{3}.

== Uses ==
Its very low heat content, even in a dried state, makes it a good fuel for heat generation. It has been used in France as compost, and is sometimes used in potting soil and as a substrate for horticulture. Because it is more elastic and robust than wood, it can be used as a good substitute for bricks.

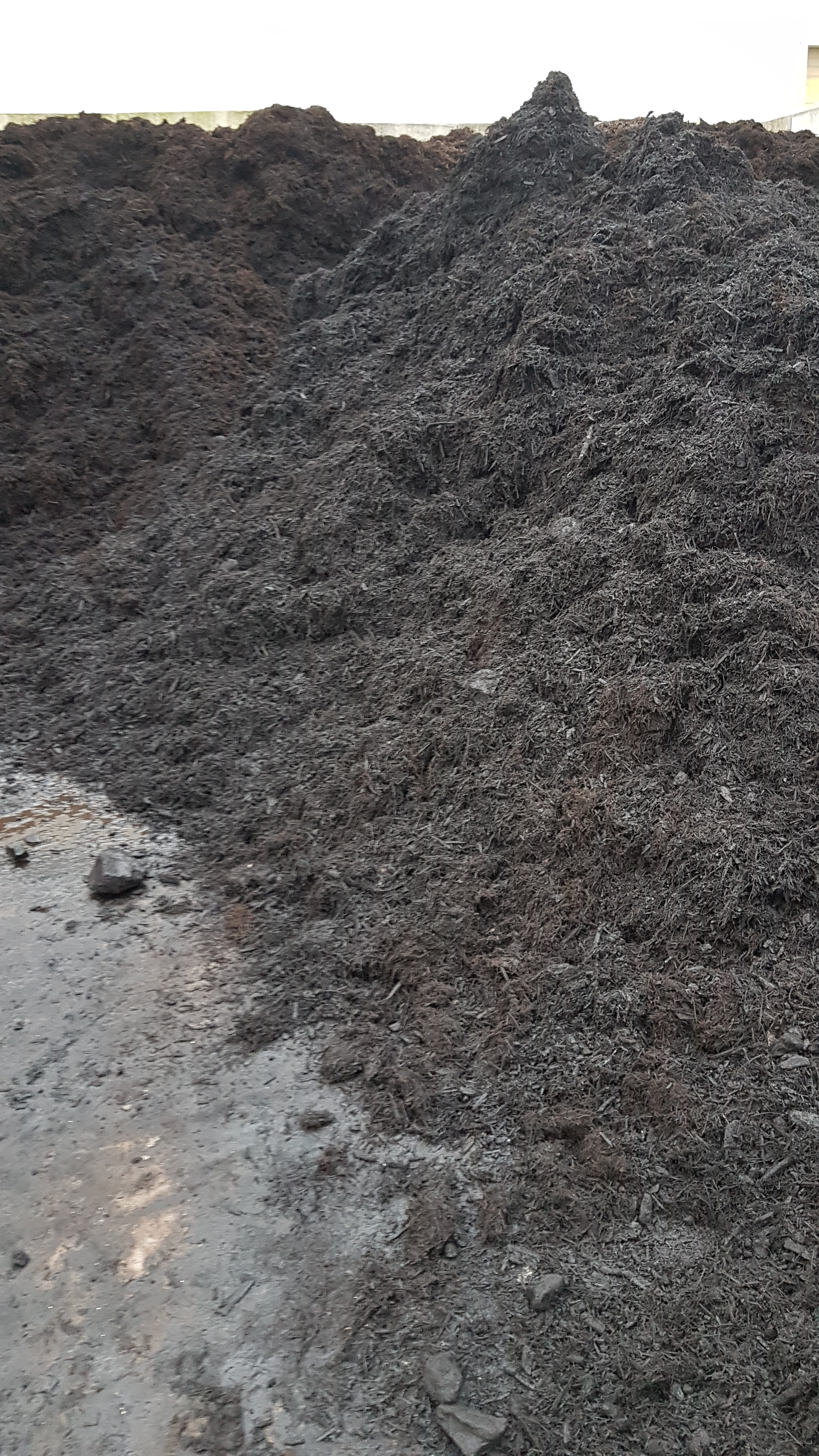
Storage of Xylit

Its unique structure that traps nutrients and pollutants, as well as its high specific surface area (encouraging trickling filter development) and its exceptional longevity (30 years), allow to be used as filter media in some decentralized wastewater systems.

== Commercial uses ==
- The Belgian company Eloy uses Xylit as filtering media in its X-Perco
- Aquaterra Solutions uses Xylit for riverbank stabilization

== See also ==
- Lignite
- Peat

== Références ==
This article is partially translated from German and French Wikipedia articles.
