= GreenScreen for Safer Chemicals =

The GreenScreen for Safer Chemicals is a transparent, open standard for assessing chemical hazard that supports alternatives assessment for toxics use reduction through identifying chemicals of concern and safer alternatives. It is used by researchers, product formulators and certifiers in a variety of industries, including building products, textiles, apparel, and consumer products.

The GreenScreen prioritizes the avoidance of substances with a high hazard as a carcinogen, mutagen, reproductive toxicant or developmental toxicant or endocrine disruptor or that are a persistent, bioaccumulative and toxic substance (PBT).

== Types of analysis ==
The GreenScreen protocol is published in a Guidance document that is reviewed and updated regularly. The description here is based upon the Hazard Assessment Guidance Version 1.4 An assessment using the GreenScreen has two major outputs:

- Hazard levels for endpoints: It characterizes the hazard level of substances from very low to very high across twenty human and environmental health endpoints addressing:
  - Human health - such as cancer and reproductive toxicity
  - Environmental protection - primarily aquatic toxicity
  - Physical hazards - flammability and reactivity
  - Environmental fate - persistence and bioaccumulation
- Benchmarks: It rates substances from highest concern (Benchmark 1) to lowest concern (Benchmark 4)

The GreenScreen process has two levels of analysis:

- GreenScreen List Translator - a screening method for quickly identifying known high hazard substances using hazard listings from governmental and professional scientific bodies. The screening is available through free online automated tools.
- GreenScreen Assessments - a full toxicological review to fill hazard data gaps and identify safer substances using scientific literature and modeling tools. This assessment is typically done by a trained practitioner.

A full GreenScreen Assessment provides a more complete hazard profile of a substance than a List Translator screening. It involves a detailed review of the scientific literature to attempt to determine hazard levels for all endpoints and calculate a GreenScreen benchmark. It may also use models and studies of analogs where direct data are scarce. Each endpoint hazard level is also assigned a confidence level based on the quality of the data.

== Benchmark scores ==
The GreenScreen List Translator only can flag chemicals known to be of highest concern. A full GreenScreen Assessment can benchmark chemicals as being of lower concern. The Benchmark scale is:

- BM-1 - Benchmark 1: Avoid - Chemical of High Concern
- BM-2 - Benchmark 2: Use but Search for Safer Substitutes
- BM-3 - Benchmark 3: Use but Still Opportunity for Improvement
- BM-4 - Benchmark 4: Prefer - Safer Chemical
- BM-U - Benchmark U: Unspecified Due to Insufficient Data

The assessment requires data for most endpoints in order to give a substance a benchmark of lower concern than BM-1

Benchmark 1 is reserved for substances with a high hazard of any of the following:

- Carcinogenicity (Cancer)
- Mutagenicity
- Reproductive toxicity
- Developmental toxicity
- Endocrine disruption or that are
- Persistent, bioaccumulative and toxic substances (PBT), very persistent toxicants (vPT), very bioaccumulative toxicants (vBT) or very persistent, very bioaccumulative substances (vPvB)

High hazards for other human health endpoints, such as neurotoxicity and respiratory sensitization, receive a Benchmark 2

This parallels the prioritization schemes underlying various international governmental regulatory programs such as the Substance of very high concern definition within the REACH Regulation of the European Union.

== Special cases ==
DG - Data gaps: Strict guidelines limit the amount of data gaps. Where there are data gaps, the assessment includes a worst case scenario to determine the lowest possible Benchmark score if the data gap were filled with the highest possible hazard. These Benchmarks include a subscript of DG. A chemical that has too many data gaps receives a Benchmark U.

TP - Transformation Products: The assessment also must identify feasible and relevant environmental transformation products and benchmark them. If the Benchmark score is determined by the transformation products, the Benchmark score will include a subscript of TP.

CoHC - Chemicals of High Concern (polymer residuals & catalysts): Version 1.4 of the GreenScreen added special rules for benchmarking polymers which include analysis of residual monomers and/or catalysts present at or above 100 ppm. If the Benchmark score is determined by one of these chemicals, the Benchmark score will include a subscript of CHoC.

== Applications ==
GreenScreen Assessments are internally used for research and product improvement by product manufacturers in many industry sectors, including electronics, building products, textiles, apparel, and consumer products. For example Apple is using GreenScreen framework and similar approaches to find safer materials in its products and processes. The GreenScreen is also referenced publicly by sustainability standards in several of these industries, including the Health Product Declaration Standard (HPD), Portico, Building product disclosure and optimization - material ingredients credits in the US Green Building Council's LEED program, the International Living Future Institute's Living Product Challenge (related to the Living Building Challenge, and by various governmental bodies.

The GreenScreen standard is developed, maintained and published by Clean Production Action (CPA), a non profit organization, based in the United States. CPA publishes the GreenScreen as an open standard which anyone can utilize. To make a public claim using a GreenScreen Benchmark, however, the GreenScreen assessment must be completed by a Profiler licensed by CPA.

== Related standards ==
The GreenScreen has substantial overlaps with the Globally Harmonized System of Classification and Labelling of Chemicals (GHS) and the criteria of the US EPA’s Design for the Environment. It differs from GHS, however, in some significant ways. GreenScreen has a lower threshold of analysis. GreenScreen includes endocrine activity, addresses PBTs more comprehensively and considers environmental transformation products. GreenScreen also requires and provides guidance for addressing data gaps. GHS, on the other hand, covers more physical workplace hazards then the GreenScreen and provides guidelines for identifying hazards across languages with icons. This reflects the GHS focus on workplace safety and communications.

The Cradle to Cradle (C2C) Product Certification program includes a hazard screening protocol that is similar to the GreenScreen and GHS in many ways. The C2C analysis divides endpoints differently and is integrated into a product certification. There is not a standalone public assessment of individual substances.

These programs have been the subject of analysis evaluating the relationships, differences and opportunities for harmonization.
