= Toxics Release Inventory =

Production-Related Waste Managed by Industry in 2015, reported to TRI

The Toxics Release Inventory (TRI) is a publicly available database containing information on toxic chemical releases and other waste management activities in the United States.

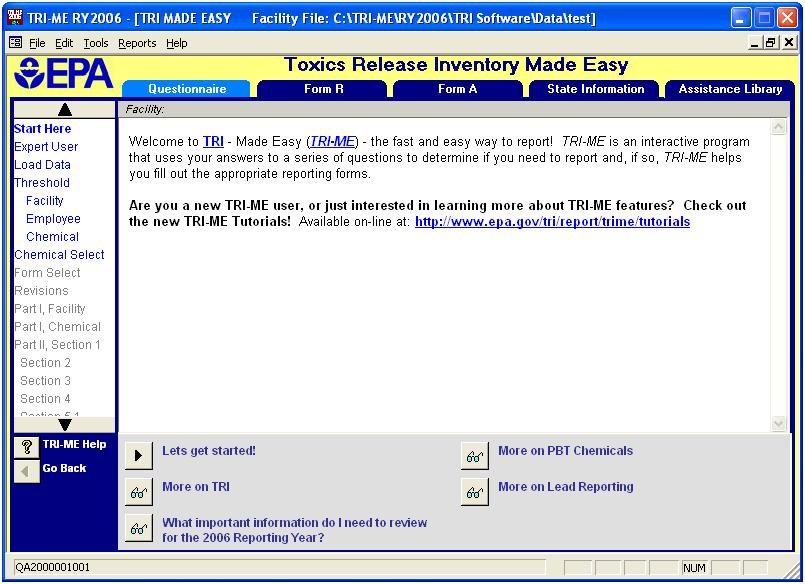
TRI-ME, the TRI computer reporting program

== Summary of requirements ==
The database is available from the United States Environmental Protection Agency (EPA) and contains information reported annually by some industry groups as well as federal facilities. Each year, companies across a wide range of industries (including chemical manufacturing, metal mining, coal- or oil-burning electric utilities, and other industries) that manufacture (includes importing), process, or otherwise use more than a certain amount of a listed chemical must report it to the TRI. For most listed chemicals, facilities must report if they manufacture 25,000 pounds or process or otherwise use 10,000 pounds of the chemical, but some chemicals have lower reporting thresholds.

== Origins ==
The inventory was first proposed in a 1985 New York Times op-ed piece written by David Sarokin and Warren Muir, both of whom were researchers for an environmental group, Inform, Inc. Congress established TRI under Section 313 of the Emergency Planning and Community Right-to-Know Act of 1986 (EPCRA), and later expanded it in the Pollution Prevention Act of 1990 (PPA). The law was developed out of concern for Union Carbide's releases of toxic gases in the 1984 Bhopal disaster (India) and a smaller 1985 release at its plant in Institute, West Virginia.

== Reporting requirements ==
Facilities are required to report to the TRI if they meet all of the following requirements:

- The facility is included in a TRI-covered North American Industry Classification System (NAICS) code, or is a federal facility
- The facility has 10 or more full-time employee equivalents (i.e., a total of 20,000 hours or greater) and
- The facility manufactures (defined to include importing), processes or otherwise uses any EPCRA Section 313 chemical in quantities greater than the established threshold during a calendar year.

If certain criteria are met, the facility may be allowed to complete a "Form A" certification statement instead of the more detailed "Form R." Form A may only be used for chemicals that are not considered chemicals of special concern, for which amounts manufactured, processed, or otherwise used at the facility do not exceed 1 million pounds, and which do not exceed 500 pounds of annual reportable amount (i.e., total quantity released/disposed of, treated, recycled, and combusted for energy recovery) in the calendar year.

Facilities must report quantities of listed chemicals released to the air through stacks or fugitive emissions; quantities directly discharged to water on-site or to a publicly owned treatment works; released or disposed of to land, such as in a landfill or injection well; and quantities of waste transferred off-site for disposal or release. The PPA added requirements for facilities to report information on quantities of production-related waste managed on- and off-site through recycling, combustion for energy recovery, treatment, and disposal of other releases, and to report information on quantities of waste managed due to one-time or non-production-related events. Facilities also report information on any source reduction activities undertaken to prevent pollution.

== Accessing TRI data ==
=== TRI National Analysis ===
Every year, EPA publishes the TRI National Analysis, which interprets the reported TRI data and examines trends in releases, waste management practices, and pollution prevention (P2) activities. The National Analysis includes an analysis of trends in releases and waste management, as well as analyses of important industry sectors, chemicals of special concern, and a "Where You Live" tool that maps the data.

=== Data access ===
The TRI data can be accessed in multiple ways through EPA's website.

- The TRI program home page includes a tool for searching recent years of data.
- EPA also provides access to the raw data through its "Envirofacts" website.
- Fact sheets and reports for all years are available through EPA's "TRI Explorer" website.

== See also ==
- Pollutant release and transfer register
- Toxic Substances Control Act (TSCA)
