= Inform, Inc. =

Nonprofit organization

- Founded: 1973
- Founder: Joanna Underwood
- Headquarters: New York, NY, USA
- Key people: Virginia Ramsey
- Website: http://www.informinc.org/

Inform, Inc. is a non-profit environmental organization based in New York City. Founded in 1973, Inform has published more than 100 reports covering chemical hazard prevention, solid waste prevention, extended producer responsibility, and sustainable transportation. Inform uses media, such as video, to educate the public about the environmental effects of various consumer products.

== History ==
Inform was founded in 1973 by Joanna Underwood in order to document the environmental impact of business practices and identify practical options for change. Inform's research has been cited as providing "the intellectual underpinning for other advocacy groups".

During 1976-1978, Inform investigated the land sales industry. The investigation led to proposed consumer amendments in the Federal Interstate Land Sales Reform Act.

In 1986, recommendations made by David Sarokin and Warren Muir, researchers at Inform, resulted in the United States Environmental Protection Agency's creation of the Toxics Release Inventory.

Chemical research done by Inform on the benefits of waste prevention helped lead to the federal Pollution Prevention Act of 1990.

Dow Chemical Company named Joanna Underwood to serve as part of its seven-member Corporate Environmental Advisory Council in the early nineties. By creating this council, Dow aimed to allow environmental advocates to examine its business practices.

In 1995, Inform published a Toxics Watch report, which revealed that a significant portion of the toxic waste released into the environment originates from consumer products instead of chemical manufacturing plants.

In 2000, Inform's Bus Futures report concluded that investment in natural gas buses is crucial in the development of cleaner buses and air.

Between 2004 and 2005, Inform had assisted more than 77 institutions in the Northeastern United States prevent more than 56,000 pounds of toxic chemicals from reaching the waste stream.

== The Secret Life Series ==
Part of Inform's Media Project, The Secret Life Series consists of several videos examining the environmental impacts of everyday items. The goal of this series is to increase awareness about the ways that production and consumption affect the environment and public health.

On January 17, 2008, Inform released The Secret Life of Cell Phones online. This video details the implications of disposed unrecycled cell phones and the benefits of recycling old cell phones. The video has reached an audience of over 25,000 people in 87 countries and has been discussed on over 50 blogs. In August 2009, Inform released The Secret Life of Paper. The video has won the "Rethinking Resources Award" at the Ninth Annual Media That Matters Film Festival. Future videos in the series will deal with beef, antibacterial soaps, jeans, and plastic bags.

== Awards ==
Inform has received awards for its research on the environment:

- 1976: National Energy Foundation Award
- 1987: US EPA Region 2 Environmental Quality Award
- 1992: US EPA Administrator’s Award, given because of Inform's national leadership in pollution prevention
- 1992: US EPA Region 2 Environmental Quality Award
- 1993: Federal Fleet Conversion Task Force, received for Inform's staff service on its working group, which was established by an executive order made by President Bill Clinton
- 1994: Consolidated Edison of New York’s Enlightened Energy Award, given for Inform's energy conservation efforts
- 1994: City Club of New York’s Earth Day Award, given for Inform's leadership in finding solutions to the city’s municipal solid waste problem
- 1997: American Society for Public Administration, New York Metropolitan Chapter’s Excellence in Public Service-Outstanding Organization Award
- 2009 The Rethinking Resources Award at the Ninth Annual Media that Matters Film Festival
