= Decentralized wastewater system =

Infrastructure for wastewater management

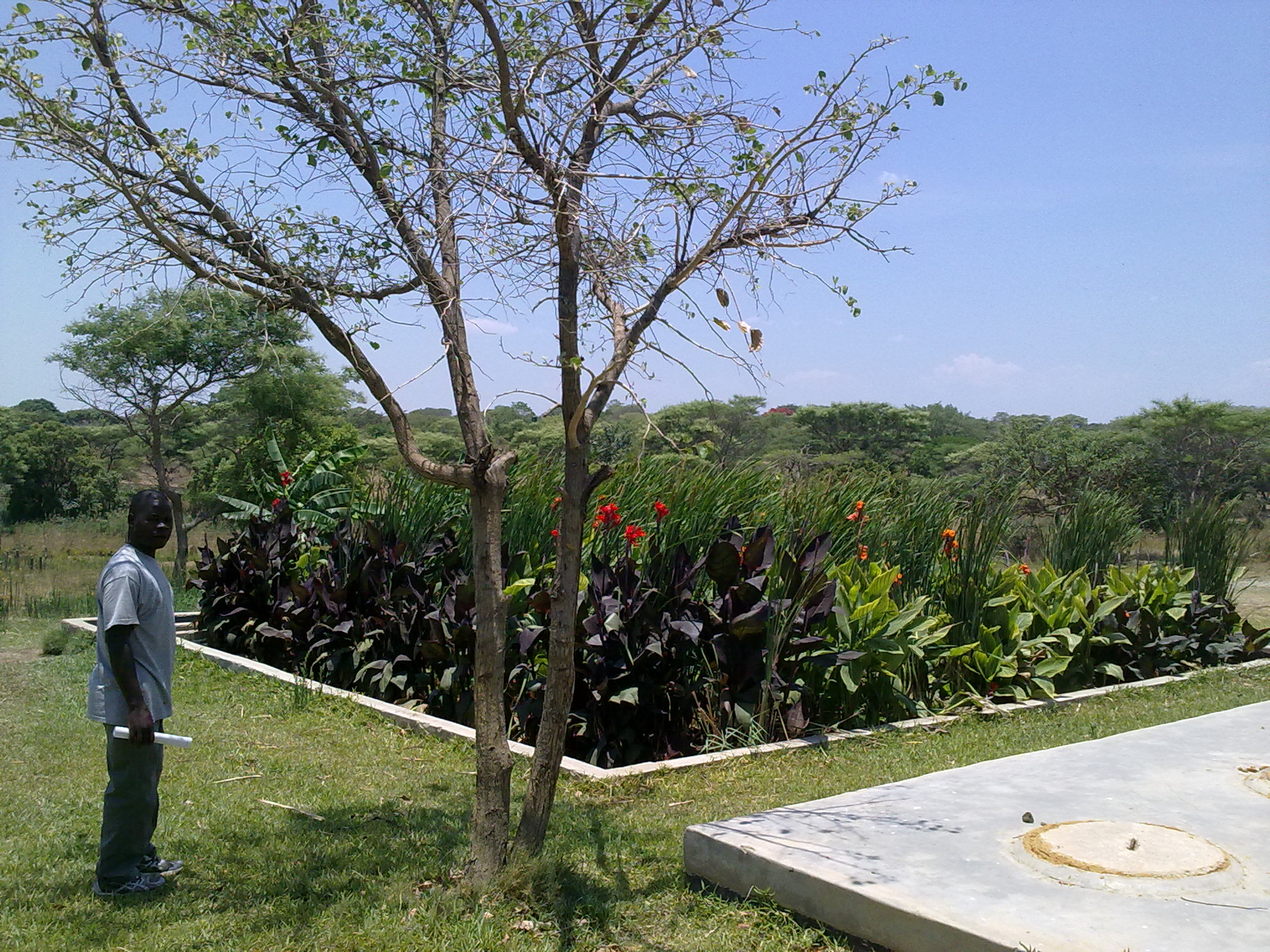
Constructed wetland for decentralized wastewater treatment at a school in Lusaka, Zambia

Decentralized wastewater systems (also referred to as decentralized wastewater treatment systems) convey, treat and dispose or reuse wastewater from small and low-density communities, buildings and dwellings in remote areas, individual public or private properties. Wastewater flow is generated when appropriate water supply is available within the buildings or close to them.

Decentralized wastewater systems treat, reuse or dispose the effluent in relatively close vicinity to its source of generation. They have the purpose to protect public health and the natural environment by reducing substantially health and environmental hazards.

They are also referred as "decentralized wastewater treatment systems" because the main technical challenge is the adequate choice of a treatment and/or disposal facility. A commonly used acronym for decentralized wastewater treatment system, is DEWATS.

== Background ==
=== Comparison to centralized systems ===
Centralized wastewater systems are the most widely applied in well-developed urban environments and the oldest approach to the solution of the problems associated with wastewater. They collect wastewater in large and bulk pipeline networks, also referred as sewerage, which transport it at long distances to one or several treatment plants. Storm water can be collected in either combined sewers or in a separate storm water drains. The latter consists of two separate pipeline systems, one for the wastewater and one for the storm water. The treated effluent is disposed in different ways, most often discharged into natural water bodies. The treated effluent may also be used for beneficial purposes and in this case it is referred as reclaimed water.

The main difference between decentralized and centralized systems is in the conveyance structure. In decentralized systems the treatment and disposal or reuse of the effluent is close to the source of generation. This results in a small conveyance network, in some cases limited only to one pipeline. The size of the network allows for applications of different conveyance methods, in addition to the well-known gravity sewers, such as pressurized sewers and vacuum sewers. The quantity of the effluent is low and is characterized by significant fluctuations.

=== Applications ===
In locations with developed infrastructure, decentralized wastewater systems could be a viable alternative of the conventional centralized system, especially in cases of upgrading or retrofitting existing systems. This can be easier to accomplish with decentralized systems, as centralized infrastructures have long lifetimes and are locked into their location and condition. Many different combinations and variations of hybrid systems are possible.

Decentralized applications are a necessity in cases of new urban developments, where the construction of the infrastructure is not ready or will be executed in future. In many regions, the infrastructure development (roads, water supply and especially wastewater/drainage systems) is executed years after the housing development. In such cases decentralized wastewater facilities are considered as a temporary solution, but they are mandatory, in order to prevent public health and ecological problems. In this context, decentralized solutions are favorable in their ability to be locally applied as needed, while still carrying the potential to cover large areas at lower costs.

Decentralized systems allow for flow separation or source separation, which segregates different types of wastewater, based on their origin, such as: black water, greywater and urine. This approach requires separate parallel pipeline/plumbing systems to convey the segregated flows and the purpose is to apply different level of treatment and handling of each flow and to enhance the safe reuse and disposal of the end products.

In the specific case of developing countries, where localities with poor infrastructure are common, decentralized wastewater treatment has been promoted extensively because of the possibility to apply technologies with low operation and maintenance requirements. In addition, decentralized approaches require smaller scale investments, compared to centralized solutions.

== Types ==
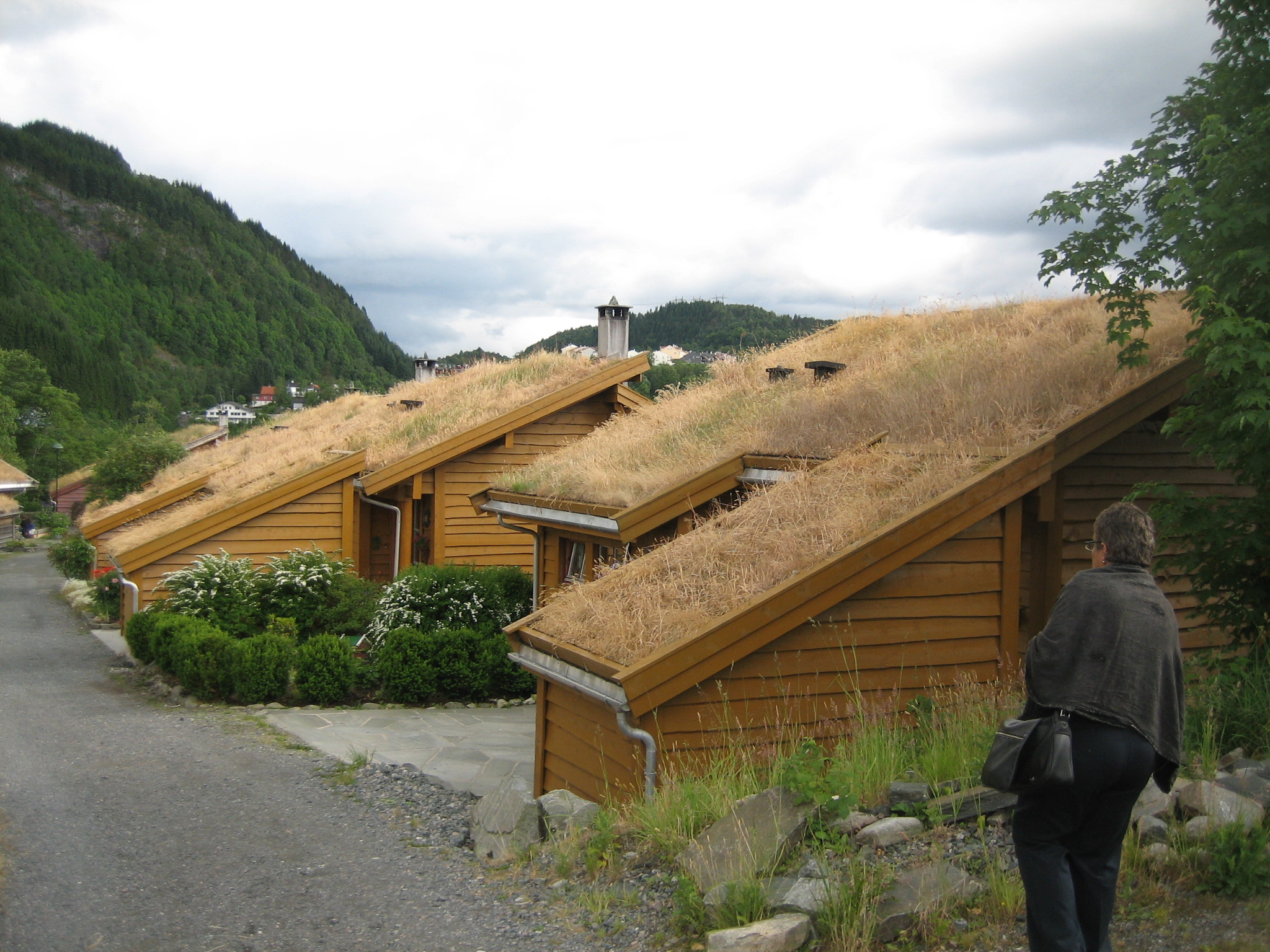
Decentralized wastewater system in Torvetua eco-village in Norway. Wastewater is collected by a vacuum sewer. Greywater is treated locally.

Based on the size of the served area, different scales of decentralization could be found:

- Decentralization at the level of a suburb or satellite township in an urban area – these systems could be defined as small centralized systems when applied to small towns or rural communities. But if they are applied only to selected suburbs or districts in medium or large population centres, with existing centralized system, the whole system could be defined as a hybrid system, where decentralization is applied to parts of the whole drained area.
- Decentralization at the level of a neighbourhood – this category includes clusters of homes, gated communities, small districts and areas, which are served by vacuum sewers.
- Decentralization at "on-site" level (on-site sanitation) – in these cases the whole system lays within one property and serves one or several buildings.

== Wastewater treatment options ==
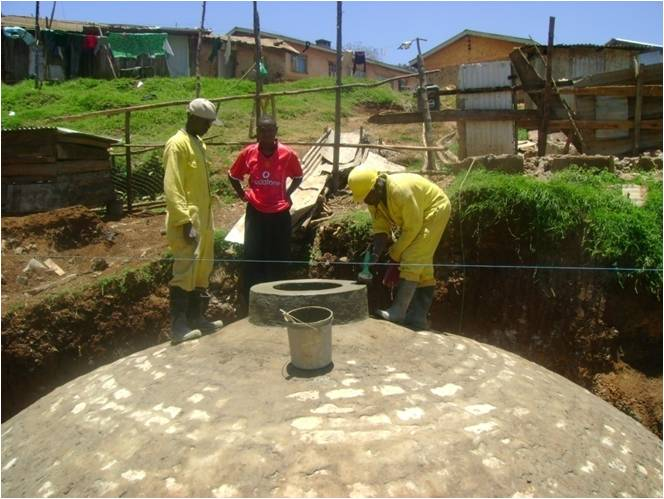
Biogas digester for decentralized wastewater treatment at Meru Prison, Kenya

=== Treatment/disposal facilities requiring effluent infiltration ===
Usually they are applied at on-site level and are adequate because of the very low wastewater quantity generated. However, they require suitable soil conditions, permitting infiltration of the excess water, and low ground water table. If not applied properly, they may be a serious source of ground water pollution.

- Pit latrines are applied when the water supply is very scarce and wastewater flow can hardly be generated. They are the most common sanitation technique in under-developed areas.
- Septic tanks are the most common on-site treatment technology used, which can be applied successfully where an adequate water supply is available and the soil/groundwater conditions are acceptable.

=== Treatment facilities resembling natural purification processes ===
Their application requires significant surface area, because of the slow pace of the biological processes applied. For the same reason they are more suitable for warmer climates, because the rate of the purification process is temperature dependent. These technologies are more resilient to fluctuating loads and do not require complex maintenance and operation. Constructed wetlands are more suitable for applications at on-site or at neighbourhood level, while stabilization ponds could be a viable alternative for decentralized systems at the level of small towns or rural communities.

=== Engineered wastewater treatment technologies ===
There is a large variety of wastewater treatment plants where different treatment processes and technologies are applied. Small-scale treatment facilities in decentralized systems, apply similar technologies as medium or large plants. For on-site applications package plants are developed, which are compact and have different compartments for the different processes. However, the design and operation of small treatment plants, especially at neighbourhood or on-site level, present significant challenges to wastewater engineers, related to flow fluctuations, necessity of competent and specialized operation and maintenance, required to deal with a large number of small plants, and relatively high per capita cost.

== Regulations and management ==
Water pollution regulations in the form of legislation documents, guidelines or ordinances prescribe the necessary level of treatment, so that the treated effluent meets the requirements for safe disposal or reuse. Effluent may be disposed by discharging into a natural water body or infiltrated in the ground. In addition, regulations mention requirements regarding the design and operation of wastewater systems, as well as the penalties and other measures for their enforcement. Centralized systems are designed, built and operated in order to fulfil the existing regulations. Their management usually is executed by local authorities. In hybrid systems and small centralized systems in towns or rural communities management can be executed in the same way.

In the case of decentralization at on-site level and clusters of buildings, the whole wastewater system is located within private premises. The costs and responsibility for the design, construction, operation and maintenance is the responsibility of the owner. In many cases specialized companies might execute the operation and maintenance procedures. The local authorities issue permits and may provide support for the operation and management in the form of collecting wastes, issuing certificates/licenses for standardized treatment equipment, or for selected qualified private companies. From regulatory point of view, the control of the quality of treated effluent for reuse, discharge or disposal is entirely the responsibility of local or national government authorities. This might be a challenge if a large number of systems must be controlled and inspected. It is in the owner's interest to operate and maintain the system properly, especially in the case of reuse of the treated effluent. Most often the operational problems are associated with clogging of the treatment facilities as result of irregular removal of the sludge or hydraulic overloading due to increased number of population served or increased water consumption.

== Urban planning and infrastructure issues ==
Wastewater systems are part of the infrastructure of urban or rural communities and the urban planning process. Urban planning data and information, such as plots of individual dwellings, roads/streets, stormwater drainage, water supply, and electricity systems are essential for the design and implementation of a sustainable wastewater system. In decentralized wastewater systems, which collect and treat wastewater only, stormwater might be overlooked and cause flooding problems. If planned decentralized solutions are applied, stormwater drainage should be executed together with the roads system.

In under-developed population centres where no infrastructure is available, is difficult to provide sustainable sanitation measures; e.g. pit latrines/septic tanks need periodic cleansing, usually executed by vacuum trucks, which have to access the latrine and need a basic road for this purpose. Fecal sludge management deals with the organization and implementation of this practice in a sustainable way, including collection, transport, treatment and disposal/reuse of faecal sludge from pit latrines and septic tanks.

In the cases of new urban/rural developments, or the retrofitting of existing ones, it is advisable to consider different alternatives regarding the design of the wastewater system, including decentralized solutions. A sustainable approach would require optimal technical solutions in terms of reliability and cost effectiveness. From this perspective, centralized solutions might be more appropriate in many cases, depending on existing sizes of plots, topography, geology, groundwater tables and climatic conditions. But when applied adequately, decentralized systems allow for the application of environmentally friendly solutions and reuse of the treated effluent, including resource recovery. In this way, alternative water resources are provided and the environment is protected. Public awareness, perceptions and support play an important part in the urban planning process for choosing adequate wastewater systems which fit the specific context.

== Examples ==
=== BORDA ===
One example of decentralized treatment is the "DEWATS technology" which has been promoted under this name by the German NGO BORDA. It has been applied in many countries in South East Asia and in South Africa. It applies anaerobic treatment processes, including anaerobic baffled reactors (ABRs) and anaerobic filters, followed by aerobic treatment in ponds or in constructed wetlands. This technology was researched and tested in South Africa where it was shown that the treatment efficiency was lower than expected.

=== Botswana Technology Centre ===
A case study of a decentralized wastewater system at on-site level with treated effluent reuse was performed at the Botswana Technology Centre in Gaborone, Botswana. It is an example of a decentralized wastewater system, which serves one institutional building, located in an area served by municipal sewerage. Wastewater from the building is treated in a plant consisting of: septic tank, followed by planted rock filter, bio-filter and a surface flow wetland. The treated effluent is reused for irrigation of the surrounding green areas, but the study registered outflow from the wetland only during periods of heavy rains. This example shows the need for careful estimation of the expected quantity, quality and fluctuations of the generated wastewater when designing decentralized wastewater systems.

=== EcoSwell ===
Founded in 2013, the Peru-based NGO EcoSwell works on rural development projects, including water supply and sanitation in Peru; they are based in the northwestern Lobitos district of the Talara region, an arid coastal area that faces water stress. EcoSwell establishes decentralized wastewater systems with the help of local residents and interns, including communal biodigesters, dry toilets, and greywater reuse projects. They also work on reforestation and constructed wetlands as avenues to naturally treat waste effluent and deactivate pathogens.

== See also ==
- History of water supply and sanitation
- Onsite sewage facility
- Sanitation
- Sewer mining
- Wastewater treatment
