= Alternatives assessment =

Alternatives assessment or alternatives analysis is a problem-solving approach used in environmental design, technology, and policy. It aims to minimize environmental harm by comparing multiple potential solutions in the context of a specific problem, design goal, or policy objective. It is intended to inform decision-making in situations with many possible courses of action, a wide range of variables to consider, and significant degrees of uncertainty. Alternatives assessment was originally developed as a robust way to guide precautionary action and avoid paralysis by analysis; authors such as O'Brien have presented alternatives assessment as an approach that is complementary to risk assessment, the dominant decision-making approach in environmental policy. Likewise, Ashford has described the similar concept of technology options analysis as a way to generate innovative solutions to the problems of industrial pollution more effectively than through risk-based regulation.

Alternatives assessment is practiced in a variety of settings, including but not limited to green chemistry, sustainable design, supply-chain chemicals management, and chemicals policy. One prominent application area for alternatives assessment is the substitution of hazardous chemicals with safer alternatives, also known as chemical alternatives assessment.

== Methodology ==
Generally, alternatives assessment involves considering a number of possible options to achieve a specific objective, and applying a principled comparative analysis. The objective is usually to improve the environmental performance or safety of a specific product, material, process, or other activity. Potential alternatives considered in the analysis may include different chemical substances, materials, technologies, methods of use, or even extensive redesign to enable new ways of achieving the objective while avoiding the problem. Understanding the consequences of each available option is central to the process and goals of alternatives assessment, because this helps avoid decisions that substitute one problem with another (unknown) problem. The comparative analysis can involve any number of criteria for evaluating options, and these are typically focused on environmental health and sustainability.

There is no single protocol that dictates how options should be identified, evaluated, and compared in an alternatives assessment. Rather, a number of different alternatives assessment frameworks exist, which serve to structure decision-making and to enable systematic consideration of the key factors. Jacobs and colleagues identify six major components of alternatives assessment: evaluation of hazard, exposure, life cycle impacts, technical feasibility, and economic feasibility; and an overall decision-making strategy.

One major framework, the Lowell Center for Sustainable Production Alternatives Assessment Framework, conceives of alternatives assessment very broadly, as a reflexive problem-solving process that recognizes the social and technical complexity of environmental problems. It emphasizes aspects such as stakeholder participation, transparency of the process, and open discussion of values in decision-making. Most other frameworks are more narrow and primarily focused on technical aspects.

=== Chemical alternatives assessment ===
Chemical alternatives assessment (or substitution of hazardous chemicals) is the use of alternatives assessment for finding safer and environmentally preferable design options to reduce or eliminate the use of hazardous chemical substances. Safer alternatives to hazardous chemicals may simply be other chemical substances, or may involve deeper changes in material or product design. Chemical alternatives assessment aims to provide the basis for well-informed decision-making by thoroughly characterizing chemicals and materials (and other design options) across a wide range of environmental and health impact categories. The rationale for this is to avoid shifting environmental health burdens from one category of impacts to another (e.g., substituting a carcinogenic chemical with a neurotoxic one), and to minimize the unintended consequences of decisions made under conditions of uncertainty and ignorance—in other words, to prevent "regrettable substitutions", where an alternative appeared better based on limited knowledge, but turned out to be worse or equally bad.

An array of methodologies and tools for chemical alternatives assessment have been developed worldwide and have been deployed in a variety of industry sectors. Chemical alternatives assessment frameworks include chemical hazard assessment methods that consider a wide range of hazard endpoints, such as those defined in the Globally Harmonized System or the GreenScreen for Safer Chemicals.

=== Examples ===
- The Massachusetts Toxics Use Reduction Institute has conducted alternatives assessments for the substitution of hazardous substances like lead and formaldehyde.
- The San Francisco Department of Environment has conducted alternatives assessments to identify environmentally and economically preferable alternatives to conventional dry cleaning technology.
- Electronics manufacturer Hewlett-Packard uses the GreenScreen for Safer Chemicals chemical hazard assessment method in product R&D.

== Practice of alternatives assessment ==
Scientists from a variety of government agencies, academic institutions, non-profit organizations, and firms have contributed to developing the practice of alternatives assessment.

=== In the United States ===
Scientific research in the US federal government has contributed to alternatives assessment frameworks and practices. In 2014 the US National Research Council released a chemical alternatives assessment framework developed by an expert working group. Prior to this, the US Environmental Protection Agency ran a program called Design for the Environment (now called Safer Choice), which developed chemical alternatives assessment methodology and created partnerships to undertake numerous alternatives assessments for chemicals of concern in products.

Alternatives assessment has featured in some state-level chemicals policies and regulatory activities. The Massachusetts Toxics Use Reduction Institute has provided public technical assistance for "toxics use reduction planning", which includes alternatives assessment. More recently, the California Department of Toxic Substances Control is implementing new regulations that require firms to undertake alternatives assessments for selected priority chemicals in products. The Interstate Chemicals Clearinghouse, an association of state governments, has also produced its own guide to alternatives assessment.

Some US-based companies have begun to use chemical alternatives assessment to address chemical safety issues in supply chains. For example, firms that participate in the Business-NGO Working Group for Safer Chemicals and Sustainable Materials have produced their own guidance for chemical alternatives assessment.

=== In the European Union ===
The Sweden-based non-governmental organization ChemSec has been active in developing resources and tools for the substitution of hazardous chemicals. The Substitution support portal (SUBSPORT) is an EU-based collaboratively-developed resource for chemical substitution. It includes alternatives assessment case studies. In Sweden, the Swedish Centre for Chemical Substitution works to promote the use of Alternatives Assessment by providing education and support to companies.
