= EcoProfit =

ECOPROFIT (in full Ecological Project for Integrated Environmental Protection, in German Ökoprofit) was developed in 1991 in Graz, Austria by the Environmental Office of the City of Graz and Graz University of Technology.

ECOPROFIT is a cooperative approach between the regional authority and local companies with the goal of reducing cost for waste, raw materials, water, and energy. Reductions in these areas also reduce environmental aspects of businesses. The model addresses production companies as well as hospitals, hotels, service companies and tradespeople.

Important elements of ECOPROFIT are workshops in Cleaner production and individual consulting by experienced consultants. After the first year the companies are audited (legal compliance, environmental performance, environmental programme) and receive an official award by the City. A number of companies at the same time goes for certification according to ISO 14001.

Additionally, most of the companies join the so-called ECOPROFIT CLUB. In regular workshop meetings they receive an exchange of experience and update their knowledge on environmental law and new organisational and technical development. The companies also receive support by consultants in the identification and implementation of new measures.

The ECOPROFIT approach as a model of cooperation of the community with regional companies is used in 19 countries on 4 continents.

- Austria (Graz, Vienna, Vorarlberg, Klagenfurt),
- Germany (Munich, Berlin, Hamburg, Dortmund, Aachen, and 60 more cities),
- Slovenia (Ljubljana, Maribor),
- Italy (Modena),
- Hungary (Pécs),
- India (Gurgaon),
- Colombia (Bucaramanga, Medellín),
- Korea (Incheon, Busan),
- China (Panzhihua) and further more.

More than 5.000 companies worldwide participate in ECOPROFIT projects, most of them in Austria and Germany.

In Graz, a city with 260.000 inhabitants, until today, on an annual basis approximately 2 million Euros are saved. Results include (as of 2002, first year savings): 100.000 m³ of water, 2 GWh electricity, 0,5 GWhs of process heat, 700 tons of solid waste. This makes Ecoprofit an important means to reduce the industrial contribution to Global warming. In the German projects, more than 100.000 tons of carbon dioxide are saved annually.
