= Industrial waste =

Waste produced by industrial activity or manufacturing processes

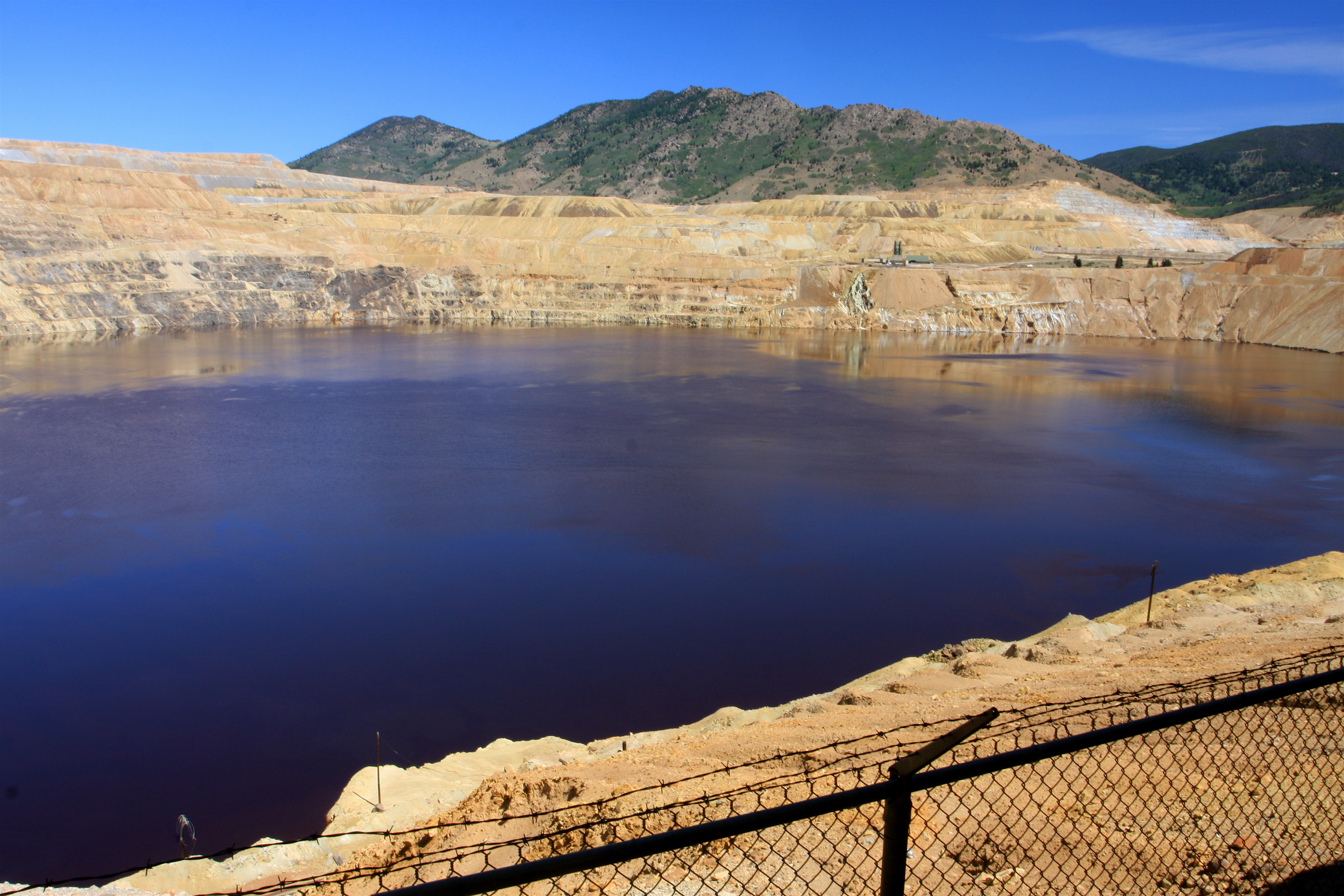
A copper mining waste pit in Montana

Industrial waste is the waste produced by industrial activity which includes any material that is rendered useless during a manufacturing process such as that of factories, mills, and mining operations. Types of industrial waste include dirt and gravel, masonry and concrete, scrap metal, oil, solvents, chemicals, scrap lumber, even vegetable matter from restaurants. Industrial waste may be solid, semi-solid or liquid in form. It may be hazardous waste (some types of which are toxic) or non-hazardous waste.

Industrial waste may pollute the nearby soil or adjacent water bodies, and can contaminate groundwater, lakes, streams, rivers or coastal waters. Industrial waste is often mixed into municipal waste, making accurate assessments difficult. An estimate for the US goes as high as 7.6 billion tons of industrial waste produced annually, as of 2017. Most countries have enacted legislation to deal with the problem of industrial waste, but strictness and compliance regimes vary. Enforcement is always an issue.

== Classification of industrial waste and its treatment ==
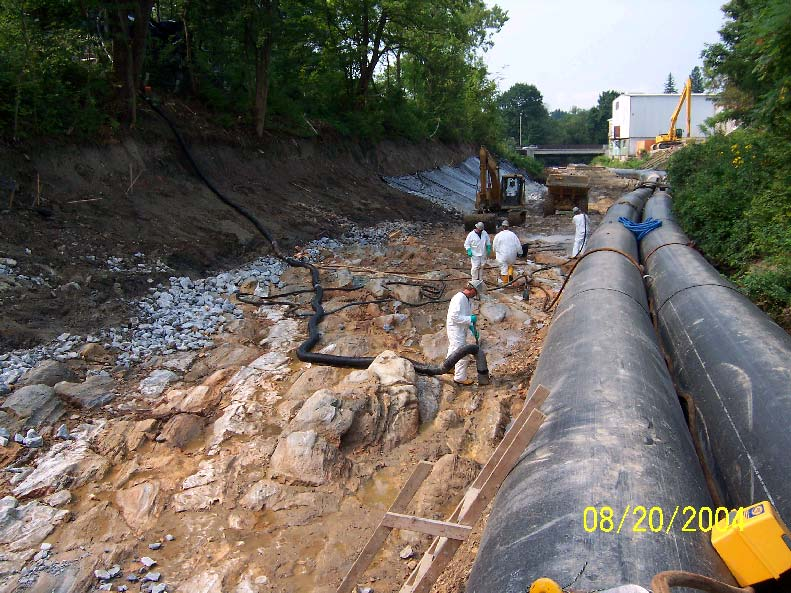
Cleanup of a Massachusetts river bed contaminated with PCBs

Hazardous waste, chemical waste, industrial solid waste and municipal solid waste are classifications of wastes used by governments in different countries. Sewage treatment plants can treat some industrial wastes, i.e. those consisting of conventional pollutants such as biochemical oxygen demand (BOD). Industrial wastes containing toxic pollutants or high concentrations of other pollutants (such as ammonia) require specialized treatment systems. (See Industrial wastewater treatment).

Industrial wastes can be classified on the basis of their characteristics:

- Waste in solid form, but some pollutants within are in liquid or fluid form, e.g. crockery industry or washing of minerals or coal
- Waste in dissolved and the pollutant is in liquid form, e.g. the dairy industry.

== Environmental impact ==
Many factories and most power plants are located near bodies of water to obtain large amounts of water for manufacturing processes or for equipment cooling. In the US, electric power plants are the largest water users. Other industries using large amounts of water are pulp and paper mills, chemical plants, iron and steel mills, petroleum refineries, food processing plants and aluminum smelters.

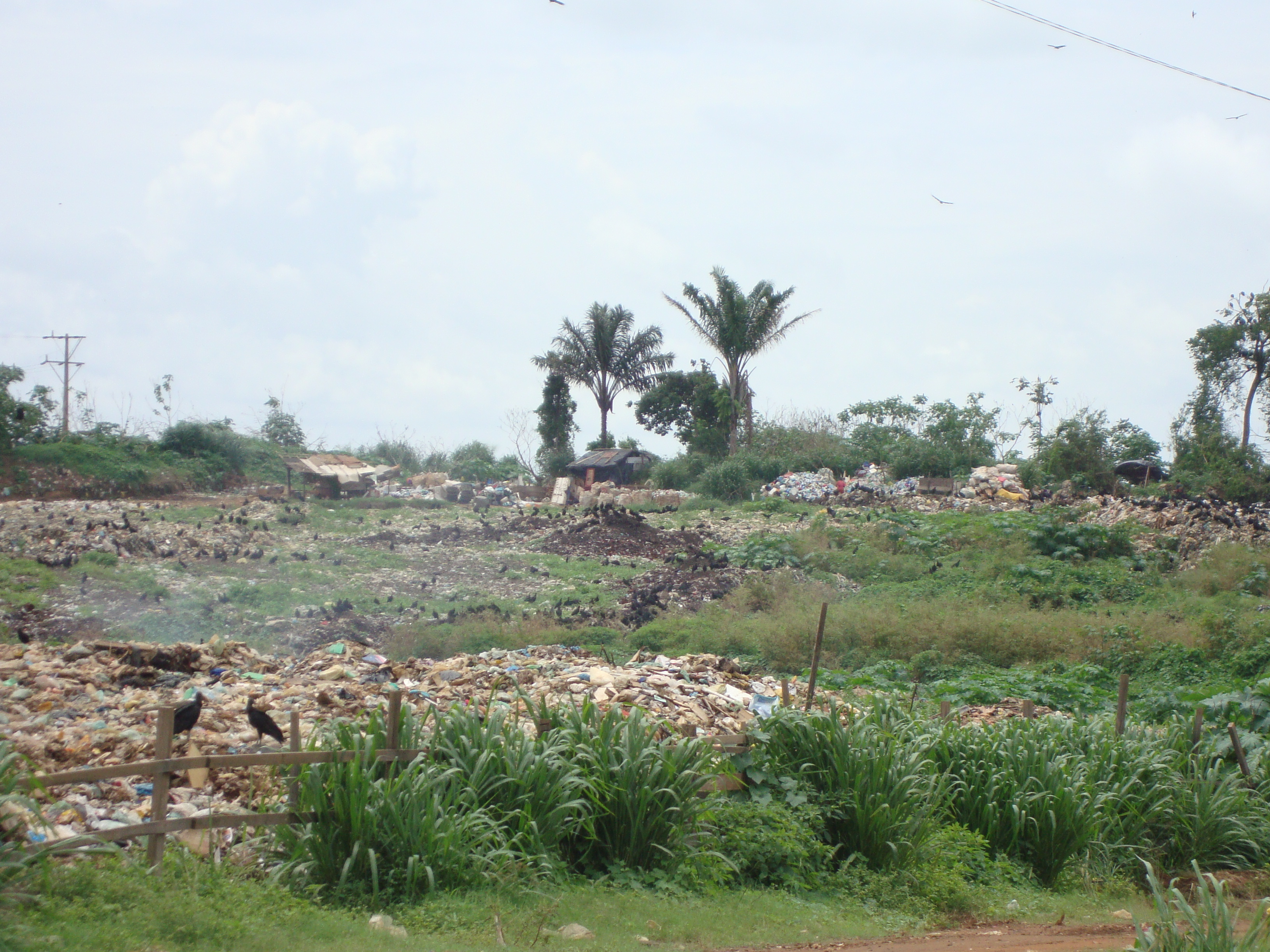
A landfill in Pará, Brazil

Many less-developed countries that are becoming industrialized do not yet have the resources or technology to dispose their wastes with minimal impacts on the environment. Both untreated and partially treated wastewater are commonly fed back into a near lying body of water. Metals, chemicals and sewage released into bodies of water directly affect marine ecosystems and the health of those who depend on the waters as food or drinking water sources. Toxins from the wastewater can kill off marine life or cause varying degrees of illness to those who consume these marine animals, depending on the contaminant. Metals and chemicals released into bodies of water affect the marine ecosystems.

Wastewater containing nutrients (nitrates and phosphates) often causes eutrophication which can kill off existing life in water bodies. A Thailand study focusing on water pollution origins found that the highest concentrations of water contamination in the U-tapao river had a direct correlation to industrial wastewater discharges.

Thermal pollution—discharges of water at elevated temperature after being used for cooling—can also lead to polluted water. Elevated water temperatures decrease oxygen levels, which can kill fish and alter food chain composition, reduce species biodiversity, and foster invasion by new thermophilic species.

=== Solid and hazardous waste ===
Solid waste, often called municipal solid waste, typically refers to material that is not hazardous. This category includes trash, rubbish and refuse; and may include materials such as construction debris and yard waste. Hazardous waste typically has specific definitions, due to the more careful and complex handling required of such wastes. Under US law, waste may be classified as hazardous based on certain characteristics: ignitability, reactivity, corrosivity and toxicity. Some types of hazardous waste are specifically listed in regulations.

=== Water pollution ===
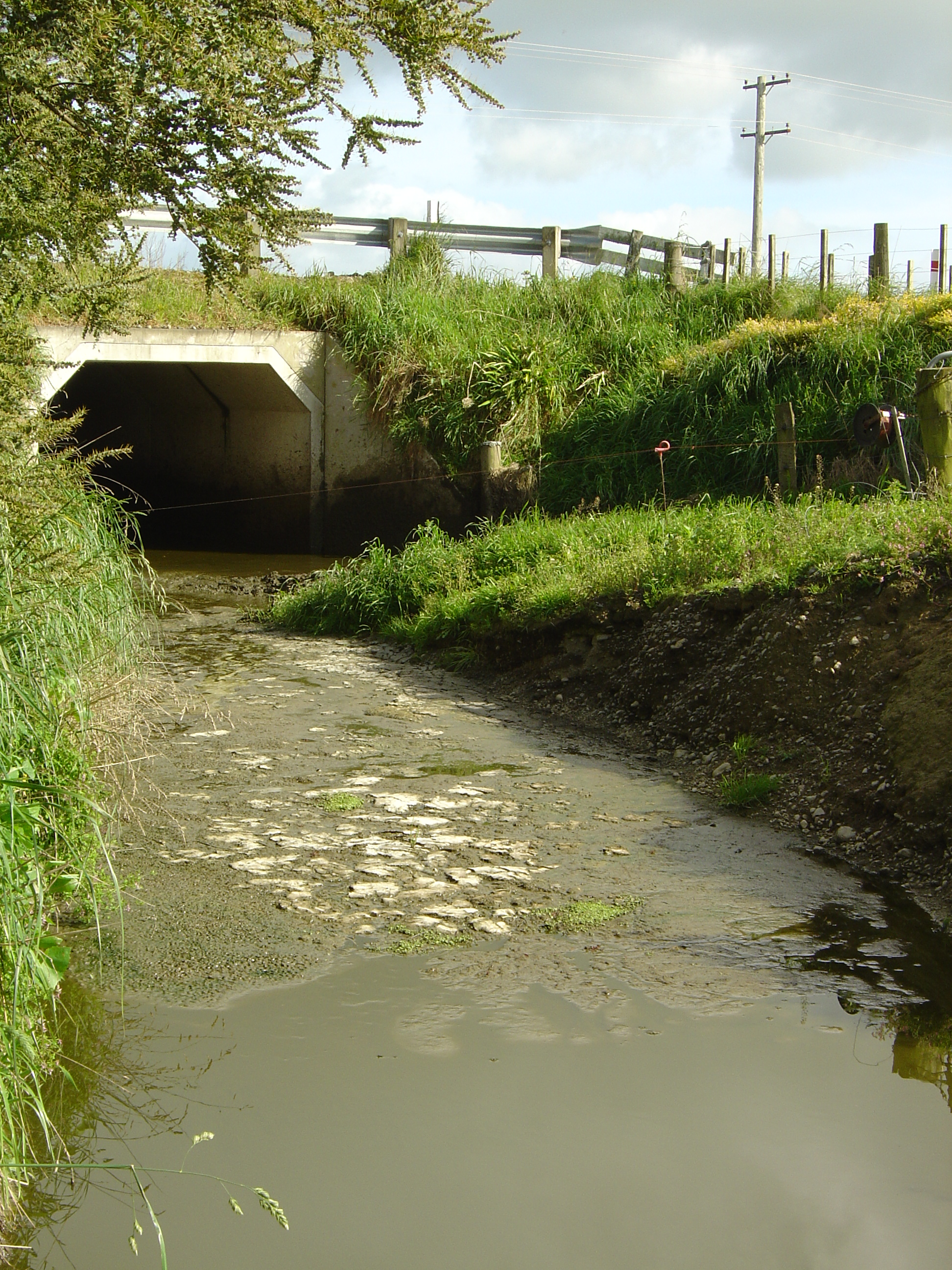
Water pollution in the Wairarapa, New Zealand

One of the most devastating effects of industrial waste is water pollution. For many industrial processes, water is used which comes in contact with harmful chemicals. These chemicals may include organic compounds (such as solvents), metals, nutrients or radioactive material. If the wastewater is discharged without treatment, groundwater and surface water bodies—lakes, streams, rivers and coastal waters—can become polluted, with serious impacts on human health and the environment. Drinking water sources and irrigation water used for farming may be affected. The pollutants may degrade or destroy habitat for animals and plants. In coastal areas, fish and other aquatic life can be contaminated by untreated waste; beaches and other recreational areas can be damaged or closed.

According to the WWF, Approximately 65.85% of marine mammal species are known to have eaten or been entangled in plastic, and all seven sea turtle species are affected. A major cause of this is Industrial Waste.

== Management ==
Global waste management practices are heavily influenced by a region's economic status, leading to stark differences in efficacy. While high-income countries prioritize recycling and composting, recovering more than one-third of their waste, this rate drops significantly in low-income countries, where only about 4% of waste is recycled.

A major global challenge is the reliance on inadequate disposal methods. In lower-income regions, over 90% of waste is often channeled into unregulated dumps or openly burned. These practices release significant methane and cause severe air, soil, and water pollution. The failure to manage waste properly carries high hidden costs, including increased disease, environmental damage, and contributions to climate change.

In response to these issues, the current global strategy emphasizes transitioning from the traditional linear "take-make-dispose" model to a circular economy. This involves a shift in priority, focusing on waste avoidance, sustainable consumption, and high-rate recovery to decouple waste generation from economic growth. Adopting such comprehensive prevention and management measures is projected to transform waste from an environmental and financial burden into an economic asset.

=== Hungary ===
Hungary's first waste prevention program was their 2014-2020 national waste management plan. Their current program (2021-2027) is financed by European Union and international grants, domestic co-financing, product charges, and landfill taxes.

=== Thailand ===
In Thailand the roles in municipal solid waste (MSW) management and industrial waste management are organized by the Royal Thai Government, which is organized as central (national) government, regional government, and local government. Each government is responsible for different tasks. The central government is responsible for stimulating regulation, policies, and standards. The regional governments are responsible for coordinating the central and local governments. The local governments are responsible for waste management in their governed area. However, the local governments do not dispose of the waste by themselves but instead hire private companies that have been granted the right from the Pollution Control Department (PCD) in Thailand. The main companies are Bangpoo Industrial Waste Management Center, General Environmental Conservation Public Company Limited (GENCO), SGS Thailand, Waste Management Siam LTD (WMS), and Better World Green Public Company Limited (BWG). These companies are responsible for the waste they have received from their customers before releasing it to the environment, burying it.

=== United States ===
The 1976 Resource Conservation and Recovery Act (RCRA) provides for federal regulation of industrial, household, and manufacturing solid and hazardous wastes in the United States. RCRA aims to conserve natural resources and energy, protect human health, eliminate or reduce waste, and to clean up waste when needed. RCRA first began as an amendment to the Solid Waste Disposal Act of 1965, and in 1984, Congress passed the Hazardous and Solid Waste Amendments (HSWA) which strengthened RCRA by:

- Eliminating land disposal—land disposal means placing waste on or in land (e.g. injection wells, landfills, etc.), and the Land Disposal Restrictions (LDR) program (under HSWA) forbids untreated hazardous waste from land disposals, and requires the U.S. Environmental Protection Agency (EPA) to set specific treatment standards that must be met before hazardous waste can be subject to land disposals. The LDR program also has a dilution prohibition, which asserts that hazardous waste cannot be diluted down by the handler as a means to avoid satisfying the treatment.
- Waste minimization—the goal of waste minimization is to make sure that the amount of hazardous waste that is produced, and its toxicity levels, is as diminished as possible, and the EPA does this through source reduction and recycling. Source reduction (or pollution prevention (P2)) trims production of hazardous wastes right at its source, and is the EPA's first step in material management with recycling being second.
- Amplifying the EPA's authority regarding corrective action—corrective action is when treatment, storage, and disposal facilities (TSDFs) must oblige with inquiring hazardous releases into ground and surface water, soil, and air, and clearing it up. Under the HSWA, the EPA can necessitate corrective action at permitted and non-permitted TSDFs.

Furthermore, the EPA uses Superfund to find sites of contamination, identify the parties responsible, and in the occurrences where said parties are not known or able to, the program funds cleanups. Superfund also works on figuring out and applying final remedies for cleanups. The Superfund process is to: 1) collect necessary information (known as the Remedial Investigation (RI) phase); 2) assess alternatives to deal with any potential risks to the environmental and human health (known as the Feasibility Study (FS) stage); 3) determine the most suitable remedies that could lower the risks to more adequate levels. Some sites are so contaminated because of past waste disposals that it takes decades to clean them up, or bring the contamination down to acceptable levels, thus requiring long-term management over those sites. Hence, sometimes figuring out a final remedy is not possible, and so, the EPA has developed the Adaptive Management plan.

The EPA has issued national regulations regarding the handling, treatment and disposal of wastes. EPA has authorized individual state environmental agencies to implement and enforce the RCRA regulations through approved waste management programs.

State compliance is monitored by EPA inspections. In the case that waste management guideline standards are not met, action against the site will be taken. Compliance errors may be corrected by enforced cleanup directly by the site responsible for the waste or by a third party hired by that site. Prior to the enactment of the Clean Water Act (1972) and RCRA, open dumping or releasing wastewater into nearby bodies of water were common waste disposal methods. The negative effects on human health and environmental health led to the need for such regulations. The RCRA framework provides specified subsections defining nonhazardous and hazardous waste materials and how each should be properly managed and disposed of. Guidelines for the disposal of nonhazardous solid waste includes the banning of open dumping. Hazardous waste is monitored in a "cradle to grave" fashion; each step in the process of waste generation, transport and disposal is tracked. The EPA now manages 2.96 million tons of solid, hazardous and industrial waste. Since establishment, the RCRA program has undergone reforms as inefficiencies arise and as waste management processes evolve.

The 1972 Clean Water Act is a broad legislative mandate to protect surface waters (rivers, lakes and coastal water bodies). A 1948 law had authorized research and development of voluntary water standards, and had provided limited financing for state and local government efforts. The 1972 law prohibited, for the first time, uncontrolled discharges of industrial waste, as well as municipal sewage, into waters of the United States. EPA was required to develop national standards for industrial facilities and standards for municipal sewage treatment plants. States were required to develop water quality standards for individual water bodies. Enforcement is mainly delegated to state agencies. Major amendments to the law were passed in 1977 and 1987.

== See also ==
- Chemical waste
- Environmental remediation
- Environmental racism
- Hazardous waste
- List of solid waste treatment technologies
- List of waste management companies
- List of waste management topics
- Recycling
- Soil pollution
- Tailings (mining waste)
