= Massachusetts Toxics Use Reduction Institute =

The Massachusetts Toxics Use Reduction Institute (TURI) is a state agency of the Commonwealth of Massachusetts. It was established in 1989 when the Toxics Use Reduction Act was passed by the legislature. TURI is located at the University of Massachusetts Lowell in Lowell, MA.

== Mission ==
The Massachusetts Toxics Use Reduction (TURI) Institute at UMass Lowell provides resources and tools to help make the Commonwealth a safer and more sustainable place to live and work. Established by the Massachusetts Toxics Use Reduction Act (TURA) of 1989, TURI helps businesses and community organizations reduce the use of toxic chemicals by providing services such as research, training, technical support, laboratory testing and grant programs. The TURI Laboratory offers free surface cleaning research testing and consulting to Massachusetts companies who are currently using toxic cleaning products and are looking for safer alternatives that work. TURI provides the required training for employees and consultants to become certified by the Massachusetts Department of Environmental protection as Toxics Use Reduction Planners. The Toxics Use Reduction Act (TURA) is implemented by three state agencies—Toxics Use Reduction Institute, the Office of Technical Assistance and the Massachusetts Department of Environmental Protection.

== See also ==
- Silicon Valley Toxics Coalition
