= Pollution prevention in the United States =

Pollution prevention (P2) is a strategy for reducing the amount of waste created and released into the environment, particularly by industrial facilities, agriculture, or consumers. Many large corporations view P2 as a method of improving the efficiency and profitability of production processes through waste reduction and technology advancements. Legislative bodies have enacted P2 measures, such as the Pollution Prevention Act of 1990 and the Clean Air Act Amendments of 1990 in the United States Congress.

== Background ==
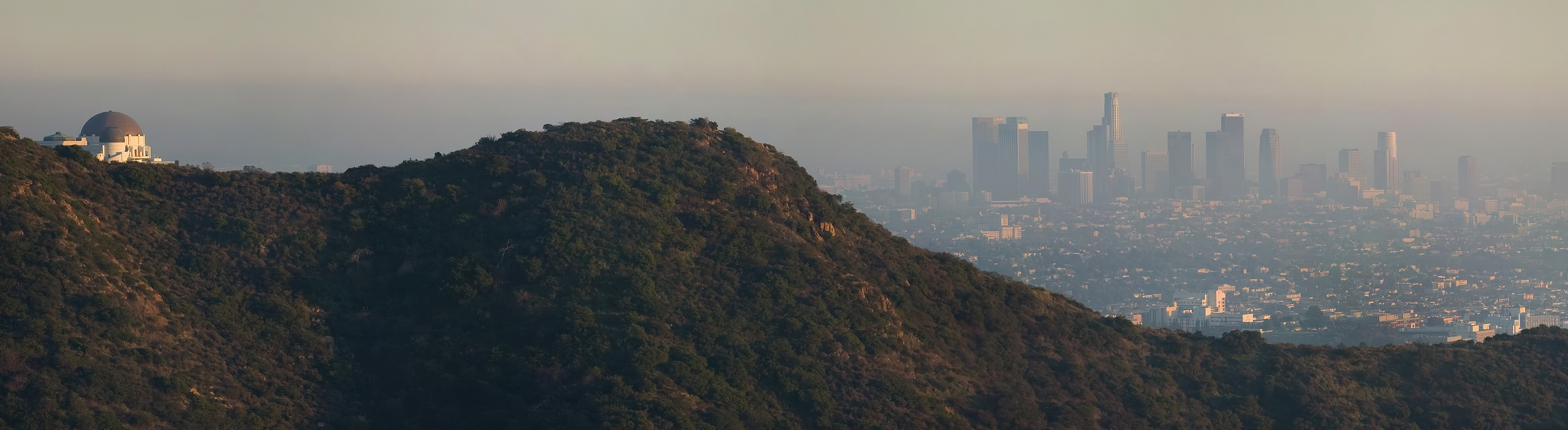
The pollution in Los Angeles can be very evident, prompting calls for pollution prevention strategies.

Historical Origins

After World War II, as the worldwide economies recovered, the oil and chemically-related industries grew rapidly, but the chemical reactions and/or production processes they used often produced or released stoichiometric quantities of waste materials that were toxic and/or caused pollution. In the 1960s, the public reacted against the increasing wastes and/or pollution, and the modern environmental movement grew rapidly in reaction. In the late 1960s and early 1970s many countries began to pass “command and control” environmental statutes that mandated particular emission limits and/or “end-of the tailpipe” methods to control the wastes that had already been created.

For example, the U.S. Congress passed National Environmental Policy Act of 1969 (NEPA) that mandated that Federal Agencies evaluate the environmental impacts of their decisions. In 1970 the U.S. Congress and President Richard Nixon created the U.S. Environmental Protection Agency to enforce the new “command and control” environmental statutes that were being enacted.

In the 1970s, many companies in many countries attempted to implement the legally mandated “end-of the tailpipe” measures, but costs skyrocketed and the “end-of-the tailpipe” measures rapidly became less effective as the emission limits were lowered. In response, many companies began to quietly / secretly work to creatively solve their individualized pollution control problems by innovative methods.

In 1975, Dr. Joseph T. Ling, Vice President for Environmental Engineering and Pollution Control at the 3M Corporation, with the approval of the 3M Board of Directors, formalized a corporate-wide program and policy entitled “Pollution Prevention Pays”. The program moved 3M away from treating the wastes that had already been formed, and instead rewarded 3M employees for creatively devising new or revised products and processes that eliminated or minimized the formation of wastes, or recycled any wastes to form usable and valuable products, and thereby conserve natural resources,

In 1974, a committee of Senior Advisers to the U.N.’s Economic Commission for Europe (“ECE”) had defined “Non-Waste Technology” as “the practical application of knowledge, methods and means so as, within the needs of man, to provide the most rational use of natural resources and energy and to protect the environment.” In 1976, the ECE sponsored a five-day Seminar in Paris entitled “Non-Waste Technology and Production”, attended by more than 150 representatives of thirty countries and nine international inter-governmental and non-governmental organizations, including many representatives of the chemically related industries. At the Paris Seminar, seventy-six papers were presented that addressed a wide variety of relevant ecological, technical, economic, social, legal and political policy issues and questions.

In 1978, the ECE published a 681 -page book of papers from the 1976 ECE Seminar. One of the most important papers was from Dr. Joseph T. Ling of 3M, where he first publicly disclosed the existence and intent of 3M’s “Pollution Prevention Pays” “3M 3P” program, which had been successfully introduced into 3M facilities in 15 countries in 9 months, and had reduced 70,000 tons of pollutants and 500 million gallons of wastewater while saving an estimated $10 million in actual or deferred costs. The 3M 3P program is still operating today.

Another important paper at the 1976 ECE Seminar was entitled “Concepts and Principles of Non-waste Technology,” and was given by Michael G. Royston, an economist from Geneva. Royston discussed a variety of economic / social / legal / political issues, aspects, and benefits related to the “Pollution Prevention” strategies. In 1979 Royston published a 197 page book entitled “Pollution Prevention Pays”. Joseph Ling of 3M wrote the foreword, and stated that Royston’s book embodied the concept that “it is environmentally, technically, and economically superior to eliminate the sources of pollution before clean-up problems are created.” Royston’s book detailed an economic / social / legal analysis of the benefits of the Pollution Prevention strategies, and criticized the earlier “command and control” approaches for failure to address technical complexity and evolution, and the importance of local circumstances. Royston also documented over 200 examples wherein Industry had already successfully and profitably commercialized “Pollution Prevention” techniques. In November 1980 Royston also published a similar shorter article (titled “Thinking Ahead – Making Pollution Prevention Pay” in the Harvard Business Review. Royston argued for an interdisciplinary “systems approach” to Pollution Prevention R&D, in order to achieve “Sustainability” on behalf of future generations.

Subsequently, Ling, other 3M speakers, and Royston began a sustained campaign of writing and speaking about Pollution Prevention strategies, at a variety of local and/or regional conferences to predominantly industrial audiences, with slowly increasing levels of support and encouragement from various national government agencies in Europe and North America. Many other companies from many industries in many countries began to adapt the generic “Pollution Prevention” concepts, and commercialize more environmentally friendly inventions while simultaneous saving money and/or making increasing profits. Public news stories about the Pollution Prevention efforts began to appear in the mainstream and industry press. Occasional peer-reviewed technical articles also began to appear, scattered among journals from the various industries and scientific and engineering disciplines.

England, France, and Germany soon adopted Pollution Prevention as a component of their national environmental policies. Furthermore, by 1988 thirty-four U.S. states had established Pollution Prevention programs, and in 1988 the U.S.’s EPA established its Office of Pollution Prevention and Toxics (“OPPT”), to support the Pollution Prevention efforts in Industry. In 1990, U.S. President George Herbert Walker Bush signed the U.S. Pollution Prevention Act, which mandated that “pollution should be prevented or reduced at the source whenever feasible; and wastes and/or pollution that cannot be prevented should be recycled in an environmentally safe manner, whenever feasible.”

In 1991, Dr. Paul T. Anastas, a junior-chemist at EPA’s OPPT, coined a new term “Green Chemistry”, but the new terminology wasn’t used in public until an American Chemical Society conference in 1994. In 1995-1996 the U.S. EPA and National Science Foundation created the first U.S. Presidential Green Chemistry Challenge Awards and initiated a grant program for supporting Academic “Green” research, both of which actions caused an explosion of interest in “Green” research in Academia. In 1998, Anastas and Dr. J.C. Warner published their now famous book “Green Chemistry Theory and Practice”, which described “12 Principles” for de-novo design and synthesis of new chemical products and processes, but admitted on page 8 that “Green chemistry which is discussed throughout this book, is a particular type of pollution prevention.”

=== Significance ===
Pollution prevention is any action that reduces the amount of contaminants released into the environment. Implementation of such processes reduces the severity and/or number of hazards posed to both public health and the environment. Prevention of pollution preserves natural resources and can also have significant financial benefits in large scale processes. If companies produce less waste, they do not have to worry about proper disposal. Thus, P2 is also a proactive measure to reduce the costs of waste disposal and elimination.

=== Sources ===
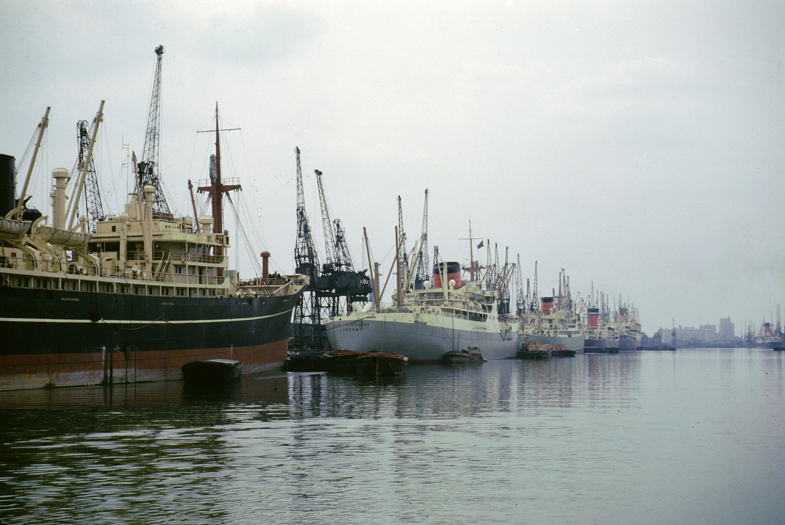
Ships in port often have engines idling for days, releasing copious amounts of pollutants.

Shipping ports are a significant source of pollution due to the heavy cargo traffic that these areas receive. The impact of these ships is quite widespread, affecting coastal communities and ecosystems across the globe. Most major shipping ports are located near environmentally sensitive estuaries. These areas are particularly impacted by high levels of diesel exhaust, particulate matter, nitrogen oxides, ozone, and sulfur oxides. The solution for reducing port-related pollution is multi-fold, encompassing attainable alternatives and long-term reduction goals. Examples of simple steps include a restriction on engine idling for ships in the port and the use of cleaner grade diesel fuels. Some more expensive measures can be taken to mitigate the pollution of ships. Replacing older model ships with ships containing new engines allows the ships to meet modern emission standards. Exhaust systems can also be retrofitted in order to reduce exhaust emissions. Looking ahead into the future, there are a few technologies being developed. For example, plugging ships into "shore-side" power sources may eliminate the need for idling engines. Additionally, various sources of alternative fuel are being developed, the most significant of which is a fuel cell unit.

Due to increased trade, the emissions from ships are expected to become the second largest source of diesel particulate matter by 2020. One approach to reduction as set forth by the International Forum on Globalization (IFG) is to increase the amount of local trading, thereby reducing the number of miles that ships have to travel. Another approach regards the strategic placement of ports close to land transportation infrastructure such as roads and railroads. Again, this reduces the distance that vehicles have to travel between the initial and final destinations. Railroads that reach all the way to ports are a significant way to produce less toxic pollutants, as this eliminates the need for less-efficient trucks to transport the goods from the coastal port to the inland railroad infrastructure.

In 2017, the biggest pollutants included carbon dioxide, nitrogen oxide, hydrocarbons, lead, and particulate matter according to Theilmann in the U.S. Clean Air Act. These pollutants harm the environment as well as the citizens living in these areas. The pollutants contribute to climate change and can result in acid rain. Citizens living in car-dominant highly populated areas are at the risk of health issues caused by these pollutants, ranging from chronic cough to death. According to Singh, the groups of people most affected by air pollution include children, people suffering from an underlying chronic disease, the asthmatic, and elderly. These groups are faced with an increase in trips to the hospital, worsened cough, episodes of rhinitis, and asthma attacks. Theilman states that the Clean Air Act has done a successful job at assessing and limiting the pollutants that harm humans from stationary and mobile sources. With policies like the Clean Air Act, and replacement of trees removed by deforestation, humans can reduct their carbon footprint and improve the quality of air.

=== Health hazards ===
P2 strategies can mitigate many health hazards associated with pollution. Long-term exposure to certain pollutants can cause cancer, heart disease, asthma, birth defects, and premature death. Additionally, pollution of bodies of water can be detrimental to biodiversity.

== U.S. legislation ==
=== Pollution Prevention Act of 1990 ===
To promote pollution prevention, the United States Congress passed the Pollution Prevention Act of 1990. Congress declared that pollution should be prevented and reduced wherever possible; in addition, any waste that must be released into the environment must be done in a responsible, environmentally-conscious manner. The law requires the United States Environmental Protection Agency (EPA) to:

- create effective policies
- establish a standard form of measurement of P2
- establish a network and advisory board among EPA offices to coordinate the prevention initiatives and data collection
- create a training program to be distributed to EPA offices
- identify aspects of policies that can be presented to and enforced by Congress
- create a model of source reduction that can be used to teach interested industries of P2 opportunities
- integrate a reward program to encourage companies to comply with regulations.

In order to enforce the points outlined in the act, EPA is directed to present a report to Congress biennially. The act requires that companies fill out a toxic chemical release form allowing EPA to collect information on the levels of pollution released into the environment.

=== Clean Air Act ===
The Clean Air Act Amendments of 1990 provided many P2 strategies, including governmental intervention, research and development programs, guidelines for efficient technologies, reduction of vehicle emissions, and a suggested Congressional status report.

=== 2010–2014 Pollution Prevention Program Strategic Plan ===
The EPA 2010–2014 Pollution Prevention Program Strategic Plan introduced a number of ways to reduce harmful industrial outputs (i.e. greenhouse gases, hazardous materials) while conserving natural resources.

== Production techniques ==
As an environmental management strategy, P2 shares many attributes with cleaner production, a term used more commonly outside the United States. Pollution prevention encompasses more specialized sub-disciplines including green chemistry and green design (also known as environmentally conscious design).

== In industrial processes ==
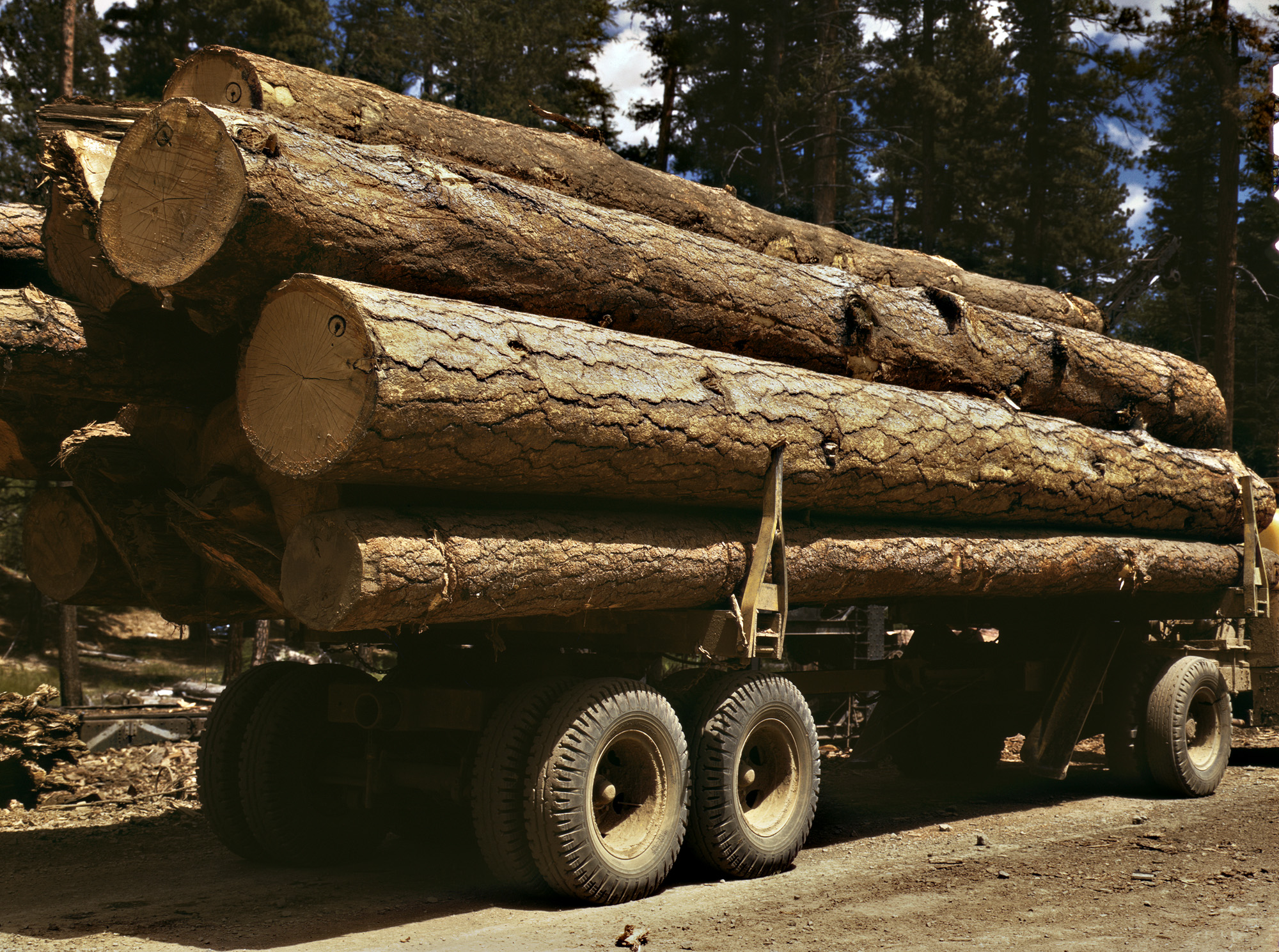
Lumber is an example of a raw material that can be saved through implementation of pollution prevention processes.

The possibilities of P2 strategies in industrial processes are still being implemented at the corporate level, but benefits are already being realized by many companies. The view of P2 in industrial businesses has shifted from one of necessity to one of strategic advantage. If companies invest in P2 methods early in their development, they realize greater gains not too far down the road. Additionally, if companies do not produce waste, they do not have to worry about properly disposing of it. Thus, P2 is a proactive measure taken to reduce costs in the long run that would have been dedicated to disposal and elimination of waste.

There are two main ways to reduce waste through P2: increased efficiency and technology improvements. Waste reduction at the source implies the same amount of input raw materials with less waste and more output of the product. Technology improvements imply changes to the production process that reduce the amount of output waste, such as an improved recycling process. Companies are moving past simply complying with the minimum environmental requirements, and they are taking a more strategic, forward-thinking stance on tackling the issue.

One strategy is "in-process recycling". Though it is not the most efficient form of "reduction at the source", recycling is very profitable due to its ease of process. By engaging in recycling practices, industries not only cut down on the amount of material discarded as environmentally-hazardous waste, but they also increase profitability by reducing the amount of raw material purchased. The most widespread strategy is "reduction at the source", which is the idea that byproducts of production can be reduced through efficient and careful use of natural resources. This method reduces the amount of dangerous pollutants present in waste before the waste is released. In turn, this creates a safer environment free of hazardous waste. This idea ties strongly into the benefits to corporations of investing in newer, more efficient technology.

== Strategies ==
=== P2 task force ===
In order to reduce costs of P2 techniques, many officials are turning to pollution elimination strategies, thereby eliminating any need for end-of-pipe solutions. A task force was created by the EPA in order to directly target reduction strategies. The P2 program task force has 5 main goals:

1. create feasible P2 objectives and corresponding time frames
2. provide training to the individuals involved in the effort
3. oversee the program's main tasks and measure progress
4. evaluate the progress of the effort
5. maintain the program's goals long term

=== Voluntary approaches ===
Voluntary approaches to P2 are on the rise. Governmental organization often collaborate with businesses and regulatory agencies to create a structure of guidelines. There are four types of voluntary approach programs: public voluntary programs, negotiated agreements, unilateral commitments, and private agreements. Public voluntary agreements are the least restrictive. Environmental authorities collaborate and create specific guidelines. Companies are then invited to follow these procedures on a strictly voluntary basis. Negotiated agreements are created through collaboration between public authorities and industry authorities. The agreement establishes bargains that are beneficial to the industry. Unilateral commitments are established by industry authorities alone, and the guidelines they set are self-regulated. Private agreements are established between "polluters" and other affected parties. The regulations set forth create a compromise regarding a variety of pollution regulation strategies. The United States mainly follows the end-of-pipe prevention strategy. However, US President Richard Nixon created the Environmental Protection Agency (EPA) in 1970, and one of its principal missions was to regulate pollution. EPA's implementation of policies is almost entirely voluntary.

There are a few keys to a successful voluntary approach. First, the program needs a dependable source of funding (from the government, usually). The program also needs a dynamic relationship with the targeted industries. This creates a base of trust between all involved in the agreement. In terms of regulation, the program should be monitored by a reliable source. In order to assure that the program will establish itself long term, there should be visible benefits to the participants and obvious results to the greater community. The long-term establishment of the program also comes from setting attainable goals to measure progress.

=== Governmental approaches ===
EPA has published waste minimization guidelines that comprise 5 major steps:

1. organizing the primary task force
2. assessing the current pollution situation
3. evaluating the feasibility of different program options
4. reporting and planning the preparations based upon the analysis
5. implementing the program.

This framework mainly benefits smaller facilities.

=== Waste reduction algorithm ===
The EPA makes available software that employs the Waste Reduction Algorithm. They use the acronym WAR for this method and state "the goal of WAR is to reduce environmental and related human health impacts at the design stage". The WAR tracks pollutants through the entire production process in order to obtain accurate measurements.

=== Industrial efforts ===
By maximizing P2 opportunities, some companies choose to redesign their entire industrial process. Managers focus more on what enters and moves through the entire process, instead of only focusing on the output. Overall, the P2 strategies that financially benefit companies are the most likely to be implemented. However, despite the fact that P2 has now been known publicly for decades and been realized as a benefit, many corporations have not adopted significant measures to realize the potential gain.

==== Potential benefits ====
Pollution prevention can also be viewed as a form of environmental entrepreneurship, as companies see opportunities to reduce costs of waste treatment, storage, and disposal. For example, 3M has accrued a savings of over $750 million since 1973 due to their implementation of P2 incentives. If implemented correctly, P2 strategies can result in an increase in process yield. By reducing the amount of pollution released, companies can avoid some of the liability costs accrued when large amounts of pollution are released and contaminate the land on which the facility is located.

=== Individual efforts ===
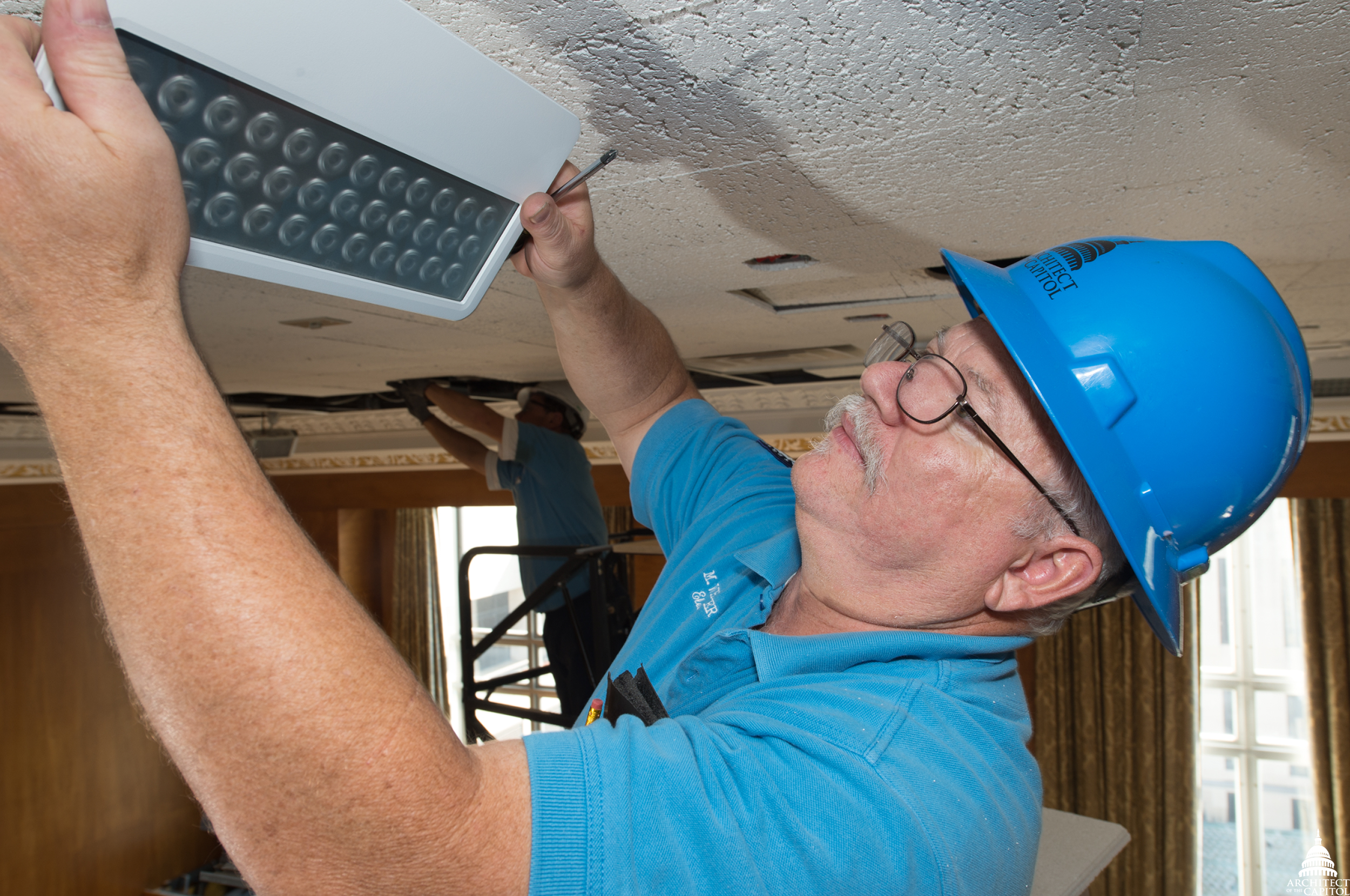
Installing energy efficient lighting and appliances are a relatively cheap way to reduce pollution on a smaller scale.

According to EPA, there are some everyday steps that can be taken to prevent pollution:

- Use paper in limited quantities, and print double-sided. Also, look for paper that has been made with recycled materials.
- When shopping, buy in bulk in order to reduce the amount of packaging required to package the goods. Look for products made with recycled materials. Bring reusable bags in which to carry purchased goods in order to reduce the number of disposed paper/plastic bags.
- Use water sparingly by installing water-efficient shower heads and faucets, and install energy-efficient appliances. Make sure that sinks and hoses are not dripping. Do not excessively water plants.
- Use transportation efficiently, and utilize mass transportation when possible. Recycling used motor oil is also a way to eliminate the disposal of a hazardous material.
- Eating locally produced foods reduces the amount of fuel required for the food's transportation.

Additional examples of P2 include using energy efficient machinery, developing clean-burning fuel, reducing the amount of chemicals released into water sources, creating a production process that results in a reduced amount of waste, and utilizing water conservation techniques.

== See also ==
- Atmospheric dispersion modeling, mathematical simulations of how air pollutants disperse in the ambient atmosphere
- Car-free movement
- Cleaner production
- Environmentalism
- Energy conservation
- Green chemistry
- Industrial ecology
- Pollutant release and transfer register
- Polluter pays principle
- Pollution control
- Recycling
- Waste management
  - Extended producer responsibility
  - Clean Water Act of 1972
- Waste minimization
- Zero emission
