= Renewable =

Renewable(s) may refer to:

- Renewable resource

- Renewable fuels, a type of renewable resource

- Renewable energy

- Renewable heat, an application of renewable energy

== See also ==
- Non-renewable resource
- Sustainability
