= Pollution Prevention Act of 1990 =

1990 United States law

- Acronyms (colloquial): PPA
- Enacted by: the 101st United States Congress

Citations
- Public law: 101-508
- Statutes at Large: 104 Stat. 1388-321

Codification
- Titles amended: 42
- U.S.C. sections created: 13101-13109

Legislative history
- Signed into law by President George H. W. Bush on November 5, 1990

The Pollution Prevention Act of 1990 (PPA) is a United States federal law that created a national policy to promote the prevention of pollution or reduction at pollution sources wherever possible. The law also expanded the Toxics Release Inventory (TRI), a waste reporting program administered by the United States Environmental Protection Agency (EPA).

== Overview ==
The Pollution Prevention Act focused industry, government, and public attention on reducing the amount of pollution through cost-effective changes in production, operation, and raw materials use. Opportunities for source reduction are often not realized because many existing environmental regulations focus on waste treatment and disposal. Consequently, industrial resources have been focused on compliance with the treatment and disposal requirements.

== Implementation ==
EPA efforts to promote prevention practices include waste permitting procedures, revisions to regulations, technical assistance to industry and government agencies, and enforcement. The agency also makes efforts to link pollution prevention to public information about chemicals, such as in the TRI program.

== See also ==
- Green chemistry
- Pollution in the United States
