= Toxics use reduction =

Approach to pollution prevention

Toxics use reduction is an approach to pollution prevention that targets and measures reductions in the upfront use of toxic materials. Toxics use reduction emphasises the more preventive aspects of source reduction but, due to its emphasis on toxic chemical inputs, has been opposed more vigorously by chemical manufacturers. Toxics use reduction (TUR) can be subdivided into direct and indirect. Direct use focuses on substituting inputs in the production process and redesigning products to use less or no toxic chemicals. In the indirect process, there are process modifications, operation improvements, and recycling of chemicals.

== History ==
In the United States, toxics use reduction programs were set up by some state legislatures during the early 1990s, including in Massachusetts, New Jersey and Oregon. Program elements may include mandatory reporting of toxic chemical use, reduction planning requirements, research and technical assistance. In the mid-1990s, the U.S. Environmental Protection Agency considered toxics use reporting or materials accounting as an expansion of the public right to know on toxic chemical use. In 1990, Congress issued the Pollution Prevention Act of 1990 to try to reduce toxins. Though the restrictions are limited, it is still practiced in over thirty states. The agency issued an advance notice of its proposed rule making in 1996, though toxics use reporting was not adopted.

== Toxics Use Reduction Act ==
The Massachusetts Toxics Use Reduction Act (TURA) program of 1989 requires facilities that use large amounts of toxic chemicals are required to report on their chemical use, conduct toxics use reduction planning every two years, and pay a fee. The fees paid by TURA filers support the work of the TURA implementing agencies, and are used to provide a wide variety of services to toxics users, including education, training, grant programs and technical assistance. The Massachusetts Department of Environmental Protection, the Massachusetts Toxics Use Reduction Institute, and the Massachusetts Office of Technical Assistance and Technology (OTA) implement the goals of TURA.

In Europe, attention to toxics use reduction may be seen in the European Union's new regulatory framework (adopted 2003) for the Registration, Evaluation, Authorisation and Restriction of Chemicals (REACH).

== Latin America and Asia ==
Latin America and Asia have industrialized at tremendous rates over the past decades. In doing so, governments focused on output to develop the economy while not paying attention to the environment. This has resulted in toxic accumulation in the land and in water sources. Organisations such as Clean Production Action have published resources for activists to formulate strategies to lobby governments for a less toxic producing industrial processes.

In Southern China, the Pearl River delta has a high level of toxic accumulation because the area has heavy production facilities which provide 30% of China’s exports. The rivers serves as source of water supply to 47 million people yet still continues to be a dumping site. TURA’s guideline are being used in China to account for the toxic waste in the river and to come up with solution to reduce it. In a study conducted in Thailand, it was concluded that implementing a tax policy can greatly reduce toxicity emissions. The main concern is to ensure that the lower and middle-class families don’t get affected by these policies, thus progressive toxic emission strategy should be enforced where taxation depends on much toxicity an individual or a family produces. n Argentina’s Rio Chuela area, there are around 4100 factories. The toxic emissions are so high that the river is turning black. After a lawsuit from the Citizen’s Action, the court directed factories to reduce the toxic emissions by 50% over five years. To achieve this goal, TURA’s guidelines have been effective in helping the Argentinian government build a framework for its industrial sector.

== Institutional Initiatives ==
There has been a push to focus on the upstream production process to reduce toxins. The idea is to regulate emissions in the early phase of the production process rather than controlling pollution results once the toxins are released into the environment. Governments, private companies and local communities are being brought together to find ways to reduce pollution output rather than pollution control. For example, private companies such as PaperWorks Packaging Group from Ontario, Canada have taken initiative to reduce toxic elements in the production process. The company was using toxic materials in the cleaning solutions which would escape into the atmosphere. The company decided to eliminate the Stoddard solvent from its production process to produce high quality products that are environmentally responsible.

However, there has been hesitation to wholeheartedly follow these toxics use reduction programs from a business standpoint. While some businesses found that by switching to a different chemical instead of the toxic ones, some other companies have not changed their production processes or invested in ways to reduce toxic chemical usage because they are unsure if they will make a large enough profit. Some businesses claim that it is too costly to run a business using alternative chemicals. Other reasons why businesses have not necessarily switched over to a different alternative chemical in lieu of the toxic one could be a lack of knowledge that an alternative exists or the fact that the alternative may not have been created yet.
