= Source reduction =

Approach to pollution prevention

Source reduction is the activities designed to reduce the volume, mass, or toxicity of products throughout the life cycle. It includes the design and manufacture, use, and disposal of products with minimal toxic content, minimal material volume, and/or a longer useful life.

The term is also used to describe measures to reduce or eliminate breeding places for disease-carrying mosquitoes.

== Synonyms ==
Pollution prevention and toxics use reduction are also called source reduction because they address the use of hazardous substances at the source.

== Examples ==
- Reusable packaging - for example the use of a reusable shopping bag at the grocery store; although it uses more material than a single-use disposable bag, the material per use is less.
- Overpackaging - Some packaging uses more materials than is necessary for product containment and protection. Redesign can often reduce the size and materials usage in packaging.

== Procedures ==
Source reduction is achieved through improvements in design, production, use, reuse, and recycling, as well as through environmentally preferable purchasing (EPP). A Life-cycle assessment is useful for choosing among several alternatives and options.

== Source reduction in the United States ==
In the United States, the Federal Trade Commission offers guidance for labelling claims: "Source reduction" refers to reducing or lowering the weight, volume or toxicity of a product or package. To avoid being misleading, source reduction claims must qualify the amount of source reduction and provide the basis for any comparison made. These principles apply regardless of whether a term like "source reduced" is used.

The Massachusetts Toxics Use Reduction Program (TURA) offers six strategies to achieve source reduction:

- Toxic chemical substitution
- Production process modification
- Finished product reformulation
- Production modernization
- Improvements in operations and maintenance
- In-process recycling of production material

== See also ==
- Bioplastic
- Conservation and restoration of rail vehicles
- Circular economy
- Design life
- Litter
- Manufacturing resource planning
- Miniwaste
- Pre-waste
- Product life
- Remanufacturing
- Service life
- Sustainable packaging
- Throwaway society
- Waste
