= Solid Waste Disposal Act of 1965 =

United States law

Solid Waste Disposal Act
- Enacted by: the 89th United States Congress

Codification
- U.S.C. sections created: 42 U.S.C. § 3251 et seq.

Legislative history
- Signed into law by President Lyndon B. Johnson on October 20, 1965

Major amendments
- Solid Waste Disposal Act (79 Stat. 992, Pub. L. 89–272); 1970 Amendments (84 Stat. 1227, Pub. L. 91–512); 1973 Extension (87 Stat. 11, Pub. L. 93–14); 1975 Extension (88 Stat. 1974, Pub. L. 93–611); Resource Conservation and Recovery Act

The Solid Waste Disposal Act (SWDA) is an act passed by the United States Congress in 1965. The United States Environmental Protection Agency described the Act as "the first federal effort to improve waste disposal technology". After the Second Industrial Revolution, expanding industrial and commercial activity across the nation, accompanied by increasing consumer demand for goods and services, led to an increase in solid waste generation by all sectors of the economy. The act established a framework for states to better control solid waste disposal and set minimum safety requirements for landfills. In 1976 Congress determined that the provisions of SWDA were insufficient to properly manage the nation's waste and enacted the Resource Conservation and Recovery Act (RCRA). Congress passed additional major amendments to SWDA in the Hazardous and Solid Waste Amendments of 1984 (HSWA).

== Background ==
The second industrial revolution of the late 19th and early 20th centuries led to major increases in the national economic output, resulting in large increases in the generation of waste. Local and regional governments and private companies developed many diverse, and frequently unsafe or unsanitary, disposal technologies for disposal of this waste. The most frequent disposal method used was open dumps and burning of trash. As the germ theory of disease developed in the late 19th and early 20th century, this led to increased attention of waste disposal as a public health crisis in the United States. Due to increasing demand for better waste management during the 1960s, Congress passed the SWDA in 1965.

== Overview ==
The goal of SWDA was to reduce waste and protect human and environmental health by decreasing pollution and promoting better municipal waste disposal technology. It dictates disposal of copious amounts of both municipal and industrial waste. It also defines solid waste as a local responsibility, promotes the advancement of waste management technology and declares waste management standards.

== Amendments ==
=== Resource Recovery Act ===
The Resource Recovery Act of 1970 (RRA) was the first amendment to the SWDA. The amendment called for increased government involvement in waste management, incited reduction of waste as well as recycling technology, and introduced criteria for disposal of hazardous waste.

=== Resource Conservation and Recovery Act ===
Congress reviewed the nation's progress in managing its solid waste generation and disposal activities, and by 1976 had decided that SWDA did not have adequate standard-setting and enforcement tools. In response it enacted the Resource Conservation and Recovery Act (RCRA) in 1976. Congress stated that the United States was continuing to increase the amount of both hazardous and non-hazardous waste being produced and declared that in order to maintain safety and the quality of life expected across the country, new waste management practices were needed. The law banned the continued operation of unsafe landfills, and discusses the implications of hazardous waste, recycling, and renewable energy. RCRA mandates that the federal government assist local communities in managing their wastes, declares that hazardous waste must be properly managed, and calls for research into better waste management practices. RCRA also altered the definitions of responsibility for managing solid and hazardous waste. Under the new law hazardous waste was to be managed "from cradle to grave", thereby imposing responsibilities and liabilities on the creators ("generators") of waste, as well as the other parties that handle or process the waste through to its final disposal. (Under SWDA responsibilities were imposed only at the "end of the pipe," involving a waste disposal or treatment facility.)

=== Hazardous and Solid Waste Amendments ===
The Hazardous and Solid Waste Amendments of 1984 (HSWA) strengthened the law by covering small quantity generators of hazardous waste and establishing requirements for hazardous waste incinerators, regulating underground storage tanks, and closing substandard landfills.

=== Federal Facilities Compliance Act ===
The Federal Facilities Compliance Act (FFCA), was passed in 1992 and holds federal facilities, such as military bases, responsible for all fines and penalties stated in SWDA and its amendments. This amendment was in response to a 1992 Supreme Court ruling in Department of Energy v. Ohio. The Court ruled that the United States Department of Energy had sovereign immunity and therefore could not be sued for its management of a uranium processing facility.

== Whistleblower protection ==
SWDA explicitly states that a person cannot be retaliated against because they acted as an informant to the EPA. The Occupational Safety and Health Administration (OSHA) defines retaliation as: loss of employment, blacklisting, demotion, denying overtime, benefits, or promotion, discipline, failure to hire or rehire, intimidation, threatening, reassignment which affects promotion prospects, reduction of pay or shifts. The whistleblower clause excludes employees who violate the law without being directed to do so by the company.
