= Solid waste policy of the United States =

Solid waste policy in the United States is aimed at developing and implementing proper mechanisms to effectively manage solid waste. For solid waste policy to be effective, inputs should come from stakeholders, including citizens, businesses, community-based organizations, non-governmental organizations, government agencies, universities, and other research organizations. These inputs form the basis of policy frameworks that influence solid waste management decisions. In the United States, the Environmental Protection Agency (EPA) regulates household, industrial, manufacturing, and commercial solid and hazardous wastes under the 1976 Resource Conservation and Recovery Act (RCRA). Effective solid waste management is a cooperative effort involving federal, state, regional, and local entities. Thus, the RCRA's Solid Waste program section D encourages the environmental departments of each state to develop comprehensive plans to manage nonhazardous industrial and municipal solid waste. Each state will have different methods on how to educate and control the flow of waste

== Solid waste ==
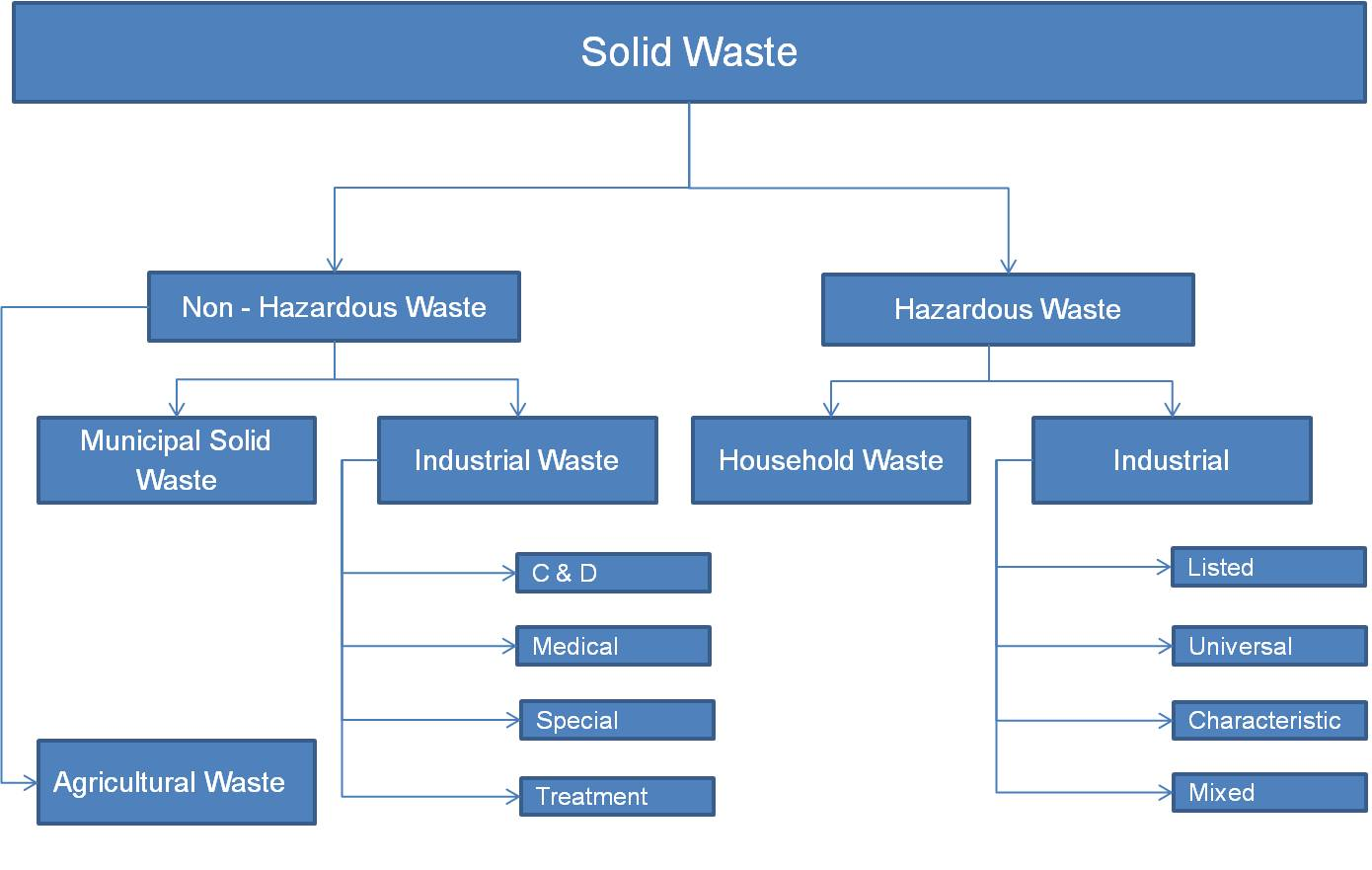
Solid Waste Tree, Based on Resource Conservation and Recovery Act, United States Environmental Protection Agency

Solid waste means any garbage or refuse, sludge from a wastewater treatment plant, water supply treatment plant, or an air pollution control facility and other discarded material, including solid, liquid, semi-solid, or contained gaseous material resulting from industrial, commercial, mining, and agricultural operations, and from community activities. Solid waste does not include solid or dissolved materials in domestic sewage, solid or dissolved materials in irrigation return flows, or industrial discharges. The large scope of the term "solid waste" means that it must be managed in a variety of different ways and that various levels of government employ different policy instruments in order to accomplish this task.

Generally, the term "solid waste" refers to non-hazardous waste, though according to the Resource Conservation and Recovery Act (RCRA) and other state regulations, "hazardous waste" is also a part of solid waste.

=== Non-hazardous solid wastes ===
==== Municipal ====
Municipal Solid Waste (MSW), commonly known as trash or garbage, includes all everyday thrown away items from households, commercial and institutional entities, horticulture, and road sweeping. This includes items such as packaging, paper, cardboard, food scraps, plastic bags & containers, glass bottles, grass clippings, furniture, tires, electrical & electronic items, and metals. In 2009, United States residents generated 243 million tons of trash, down from 255 million tons in 2007. In the same period, the per capita generation of MSW lowered to 4.34 lbs/person/day from 4.63 lbs/person/day.

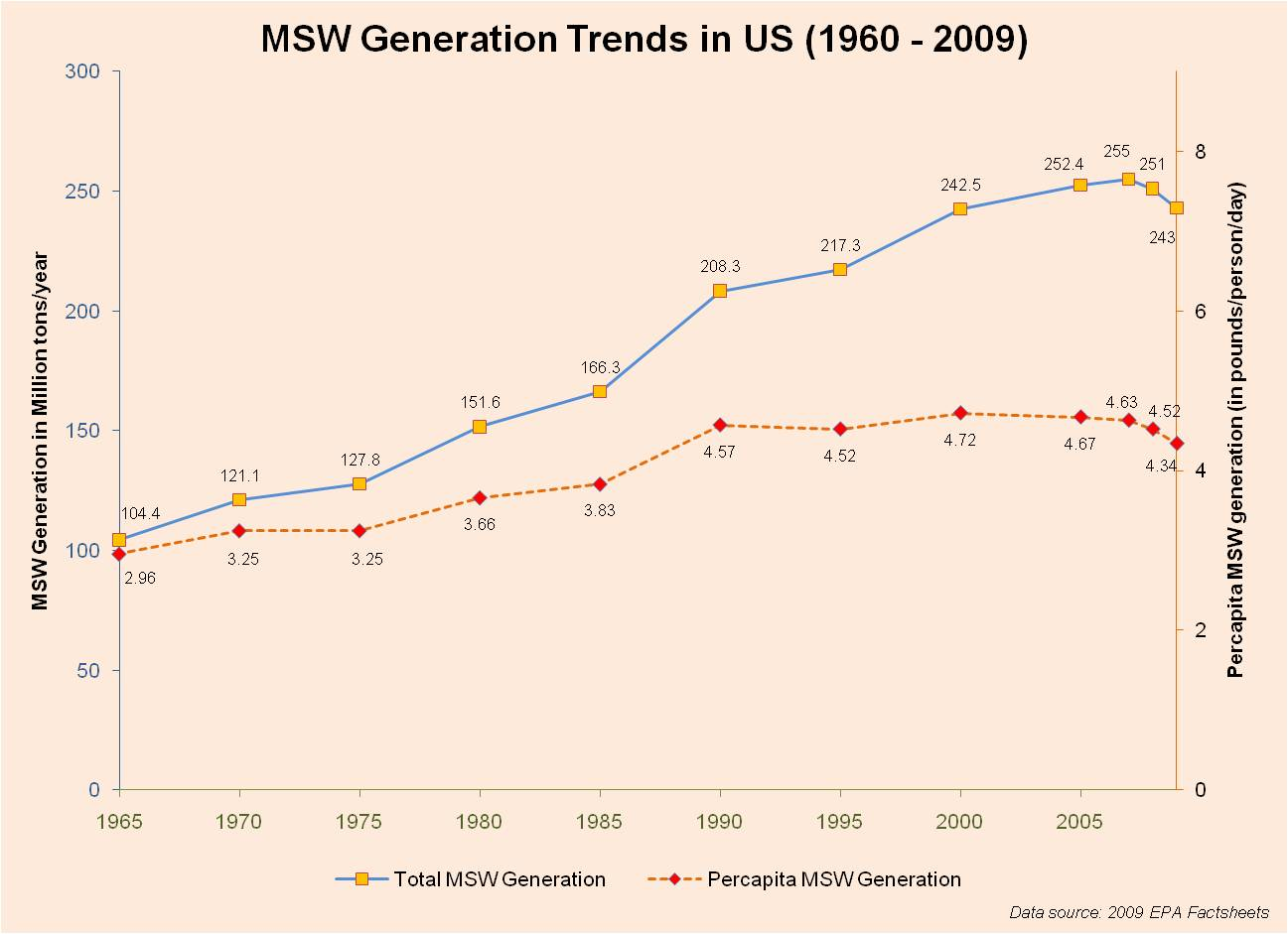
Figure 2 - MSW generation trends (1960–2009), based on US EPA MSW 2009 facts and figures

==== Agricultural and animal ====
Agricultural wastes include primary crop residues that remain in fields after harvest and secondary processing residues generated from the harvested portions of crops during food, feed, and fiber production. This is generated during the production and distribution through decomposition of food, vegetables, or meat, removal of non-usable parts, removal of substandard products, and spoiling due to substandard packaging. Thus the agricultural waste is generated at all stages of the food system including farming, storage, processing, and wholesaling. The food scraps generated by retailers and consumers are not included in this category as these scraps enter the waste stream as municipal solid waste. Animal wastes are wastes generated from farms and feedlots, also known as Animal Feeding Operations (AFOs) or Concentrated Animal Feeding Operations (CAFOs), consisting of leftover feeds, manure and urine, wastewater, dead animals, and production operation wastes. They produce large amounts of waste in small areas. For example, the EPA reports that a single dairy cow produces approximately 120 pounds of wet manure per day, equaling 20-40 people. The main problems of animal waste mismanagement are environmental, especially water pollution.

==== Industrial ====
Industrial waste consists of a significant amount of solid waste. EPA reported that each year United States industrial facilities generate and dispose of approximately 7.6 billion tons of industrial solid waste based on 1980s figures. This figure includes waste generated from 17 industrial manufacturers of organic chemicals, inorganic chemicals, iron and steel, plastics and resins, stone, clay, glass, concrete, pulp and paper, food, and kindred products. Industrial waste does not go into the municipal solid waste stream and therefore is landfilled or processed separately. As per EPA guidelines industrial waste management units have to consider waste characterization and minimization methods, waste constituent information factsheets, risk assessment tools, institutional mechanism/stakeholder partnership principles, safe and proper design guidelines, water (surface and ground) and air monitoring procedures, and facility pre- and post-closure recommendations.

==== Construction and demolition ====
C&D waste includes debris generated during the construction, renovation, and demolition of buildings, roads, and bridges. This can be often bulky and heavy building materials consisting of concrete, building wood waste, asphalt from roads and roof shingles, drywall gypsum, metals, bricks, blocks, glass, plastics, building components like doors, windows, and fixtures, and trees, stumps, earth, and rock from construction and clearing sites. Since this often consists of bulky and heavy materials, proper waste management can improve resources. EPA estimated that 136 million tons of building-related C&D waste was generated in the United States in 1996.

==== Treatment ====
Treatment waste consists of sludge, byproducts, coproducts, or metal scraps resulting from a facility or plant. Sludge is any solid, semisolid, or liquid waste generated from a municipal, commercial, or industrial wastewater treatment plant, water supply treatment plant, or air pollution control facility exclusive of the treated effluent from a wastewater treatment plant. This includes electric arc furnace dust and baghouse dusts. A byproduct is a material that is not a primary product which is not solely or separately produced in a production process whereas coproducts are intentionally produced. Byproducts need further processing to be useful whereas coproducts are highly processed and can be sold as a commodity without further processing. Examples of byproducts include slag, fly ash, heavy ends, distillation column bottoms, etc. and coproducts include metals such as lead produced during the copper refining process. Scrap metal wastes include sheet metal, wire, metal tanks and containers, scrap automobiles, and machine shop turnings that are generally nonhazardous in nature.

==== Medical waste ====
Medical waste and biomedical waste consist of all waste materials generated at health care facilities including hospitals, clinics, offices of physicians, dentists, and veterinarians, blood banks, home health care facilities, funeral homes, medical research facilities, and laboratories. RCRA Subtitle J regulated medical waste in four states (New York, New Jersey, Connecticut, Rhode Island) and Puerto Rico, and expired on March 22, 1991. (See Medical Waste Tracking Act.) State environmental and health agencies regulate medical waste, rather than EPA. Other federal agencies have issued safety regulations governing the handling of medical waste, including the Centers for Disease Control and Prevention, Occupational Safety and Health Administration, and the Food and Drug Administration.

==== Special wastes ====
Congress designated several kinds of industrial wastes as "special wastes," which are exempt from hazardous waste handling requirements under RCRA Subtitle C, including oil and gas exploration and production wastes (such as drill cuttings, produced water, and drilling fluids), coal combustion residuals generated by electric power plants and other industries, mining waste, and cement kiln dust. See Solid Waste Disposal Amendments of 1980.

=== Hazardous Solid Wastes ===
The EPA, which regulates hazardous waste under Subtitle C of the Resource Conservation and Recovery Act (RCRA), considers a waste hazardous waste if it is dangerous or potentially harmful to human health or the environment. Hazardous waste can be liquids, solids, gases, or sludges and can be discarded household, industrial, or commercial products such as oil, paints, certain electronics waste, cleaning fluids or pesticides, or the by-products of manufacturing processes.

- Household Hazardous Wastes: This includes used and leftover household products that contain, corrosive, toxic, ignitable, or reactive constituents. Examples are medical waste, used oil, paints, cleaners, batteries, pesticides, and light bulbs/lamps. Since these contain potentially hazardous ingredients, improper disposal can lead to human health risks and environmental pollution. Proper and safe management of hazardous wastes is important in the collection, reuse, recycling, and disposal stages which are mostly facilitated by the municipalities or local governments and specified by EPA in household hazardous waste regulations.
- Industrial Hazardous Wastes: The primary generators of hazardous wastes in any region are industrial facilities, manufacturing and processing units, workshops and maintenance units, nuclear facilities, chemical units, etc. The following section briefly describes the four main types of industrial hazardous wastes.
- Listed Waste: 40CFR Part261 specifies four lists of wastes. These are:
  - F-list: This is waste mainly generated from industrial or manufacturing processes or other different industrial sectors, also called non-specific source wastes.
  - K-list: This is generated from specific industrial sources such as petroleum refining, wood treatment, pesticide manufacturing, inorganic pigment of chemical manufacturing, metal and coke production, and veterinary pharmaceutical industries.
  - P-list and U-list: These are discarded or intended to be discarded commercial chemical products that have listed generic names, container residues, spill residues, or off-specification species. P-list differs from U-waste where the former is acute hazardous waste and the latter toxic waste.
- Universal Waste: Federal regulations have designated hazardous wastes such as batteries, pesticides, mercury-containing equipment, and light bulbs/lamps as universal wastes. This is a way to streamline them separately and control and facilitate proper collection, storage, recovery or treatment, and disposal that encourages reducing the quantity of such wastes going to landfills and incinerators and thereby increases recovery and recycling rates.
- Characteristic Waste: These are wastes that are defined based on their specific characteristics of ignitability, corrosivity, reactivity, and toxicity. Federal statute 40CFR§261 regulates these wastes. Ignitable wastes are defined by their combustion capacity under conditions when they consist of waste oils and solvents. Corrosive wastes like battery acids are characterized by their pH value – acids (pH ≤ 2) and bases (pH ≥ 12.5). Reactive wastes include lithium-sulfur batteries and explosives that can cause explosions, toxic fumes, or gases and toxic wastes that are harmful to human health or environment when inhaled or ingested or disposed. Examples of toxic wastes include mercury and lead.
- Mixed Waste: These are wastes that contain both radioactive and hazardous waste components making them complicated to regulate. Low Level Mixed Wastes (LLMW) are generated from sources such as industrial, hospital, and nuclear power plant facilities and also from processes such as medical diagnostic testing and research, pharmaceutical and biotechnology development, pesticide research, and nuclear power plant operations. The other two types are High Level Mixed Waste (HLW) and Mixed Trans Uranic Waste (MTRU).

=== Sources ===
In 2009, U.S. residents, businesses, and institutions produced more than 243 million tons of municipal solid waste, which is approximately 4.34 lbs/person/day. In addition, American industrial facilities generate and dispose of approximately 7.6 billion tons of industrial solid waste each year as per the EPA estimations in 1980. These levels may be much higher now in the 21st century. The primary sources of solid waste are residential, commercial, and industrial entities, construction and renovation sites, hospitals, agricultural fields and animal farms, and treatment and processing plants.

=== Disposal ===
Before the 1980s most of the waste generated was either landfilled or burned. More than 90% of the municipal solid waste was landfilled or disposed with less than 7% materials recovery during the 1960s and 70s. This trend started changing after the 1980s when landfill disposal declined to about 54% and resource recovery increased to more than 33%. The most recent numbers from the EPA indicate that in 2012 the US municipal solid waste recycle rate was 34.5%. This section describes the common methods of solid waste disposal practiced in United States and worldwide.

- Landfills: These are technically designed areas where waste is disposed scientifically. They are characterized by liners that prevent seepage of leachates into the groundwater. There are different designs for landfills used for municipal solid waste or household waste, construction & demolition waste, and hazardous waste. According to an EPA report, the number of municipal solid waste landfills has gone down from 7924 in 1988 to 1754 in 2006. There were close to 1900 construction & demolition landfills in 1994.
- Combustion or Incineration: Combustion or incineration of waste reduces the amount of landfill space needed by burning waste in a controlled manner and also generates electricity through waste-to-energy technologies such as gasification, pyrolysis, anaerobic digestion, fermentation, etc.
- Transfer Stations: Transfer stations are intermediate facilities where the collected municipal solid waste is unloaded from collection trucks, compacted to reduce the volume of the waste, and held for a short time before it is reloaded onto larger, long-distance trucks or containers for shipment to landfills or other treatment and disposal facilities.
- Recovery & Recycling: Wastes are also good sources of raw materials. Recovery and recycling of wastes can help to reduce the use of virgin materials for producing new goods. Recycling construction & demolition waste can also save the space in landfills and large amounts of materials like metals, glass, plastics, and cardboards can be recovered.
- Composting: Composting is a way to return nutrients back into the environment by allowing microorganisms to turn the waste into manure. Applying this manure to agricultural land can improve the fertility of the soil providing it essential nutrients. It is estimated that 27.8% of the municipal solid waste generated in United States in 2009 was organic waste consisting of yard trimmings and food waste that is compostable. The agricultural and animal waste generated can also be composted and used as manure. For example, it is estimated that a dairy cow produces approximately 40 pounds of waste (dung, urine) per day which can be dried and used as manure. This manure can also be used in digesters to produce biogas (methane gas) or electricity, and other biofuels like ethanol.

=== Costs and problems associated with waste ===
Some of the main issues associated with waste are open dumping, odor, particulate matter emissions, leachate seepage from landfills, greenhouse gas (GHG) emissions that lead to air pollution, surface and groundwater pollution, food chain contamination, land area depletion, human health impacts, environmental degradation, and negative impacts on plant and animal life.

== Rationales for solid waste policy ==
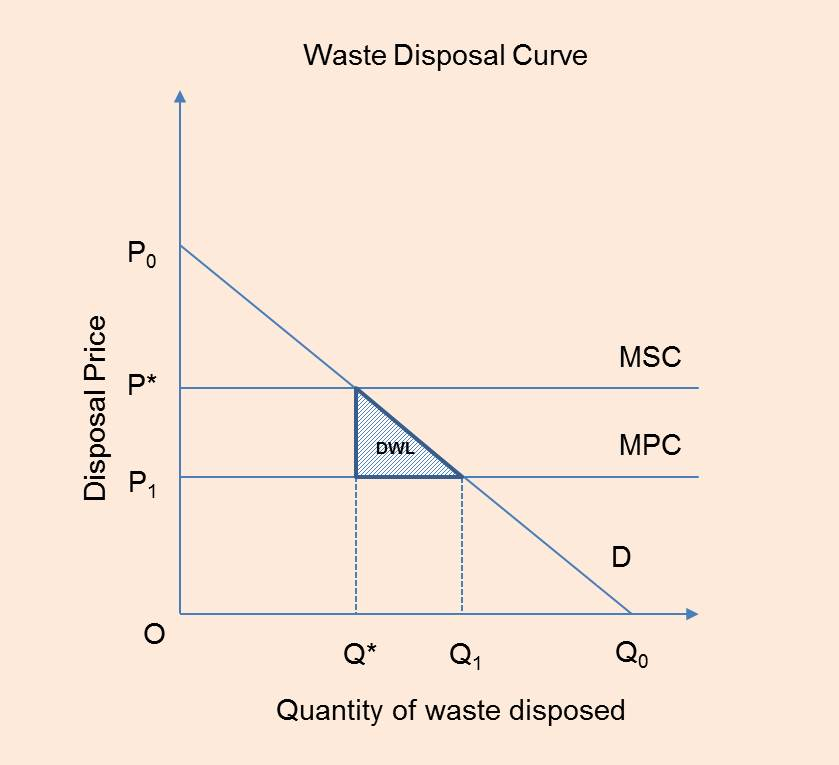
Figure 3 - Demand Curve and Deadweight loss (DWL), Based on Portney and Stavins (2000), Page 269

All levels of government - federal, state, and local - are involved in regulating solid waste in United States. Proper waste management extends from solid waste collection, segregation, transportation, storing, treatment and disposal to education, labeling, trading, and interstate & intercontinental movement of waste. Portney and Stavins (2000) provide the following three rationales for government intervention in private waste markets:

1. Economies of scale - The cost of producing goods or services decreases as production increases. With regards to solid waste this principle applies to landfills where the average cost of landfill construction, operation, and maintenance decreases as waste disposed of increases. This propels interstate trade where private parties divert wastes to large regional landfills.
2. Public bad - Waste creates dissatisfaction to people which reduces social benefits or increases social cost, making it the opposite of a public good. The government, through its policies, makes waste an "excludable" good (or bad) thereby creating opportunities for waste collection firms to charge the household, industrial, and commercial waste generators for proper collection and disposal.
3. Negative externalities - Production of waste leads to environmental pollution especially when it is illegally disposed of, openly dumped, or burned, resulting in groundwater contamination or air pollution. It has been proven that emissions include high amounts of methane and trace amounts of benzene, hydrogen sulphide, and chorinated hydrocarbons along with other gases.

This demand curve and the deadweight loss (DWL) associated with waste disposal (landfilling) is illustrated in Figure 3.

== Mechanisms and policy framework ==
The government has a wide variety of different policy tools at its disposal from which it can choose. Due to the diverse nature of solid waste, the government employs a number of different policy tools at various levels in order to ensure efficient and safe handling and disposal of the many different types of waste, as well as in order to encourage recycling and source reduction. The following is a sampling of tools the United States government employs with regards to solid waste.

=== Deposit Refund ===
Deposit-refund systems or container deposit legislation, also known as "bottle bills", can be viewed either as a tax on producing waste in the form of beverage containers or as a subsidy for properly recycling these containers. When a retailer buys products from a distributor, it must pay a deposit for each beverage container it purchases. The retailer then includes the cost of the deposit in the item's price, passing it to the consumer. However, the consumer is refunded this money by properly disposing of the used beverage container at a retail or redemption center. The retailer also recoups the deposit from the distributor. This system encourages consumers to properly dispose of the waste they generate by buying beverages in disposable containers. It also creates a privately funded system for the handling of this waste. A deposit-refund bill named National Beverage Container Reuse and Recycling Act was introduced by the House of Representatives in 1994 but never became federal law. Bottle bills are currently in place in ten states as well as in Guam. Delaware repealed its bottle bill in 2010. Oregon was the first state to institute a bottle bill in 1971. The most common deposit is five cents, but this varies by state and by the type of container.

=== Pay as you throw ===
Pay as you throw is a model for pricing the disposal of municipal solid waste by unit of waste rather than by charging a uniform price for pickup and disposal. This acts as a tax on waste - the more waste a household produces, the more it will be charged for its disposal. Pay as you throw is administered on the municipal level. The purpose behind this system is to discourage waste generation and to encourage recycling. By charging citizens per unit of waste, municipalities hope to discourage waste generation by causing households to consider the quantity of waste they are producing by making them pay for it. It is estimated that pay as you throw programs have decreased municipal solid waste by about 17% in weight, with a 6% decrease attributed to source reduction efforts and an 8-11% due to waste diversion to recycling and yard programs. In 2006, pay as you throw had been instituted in over 7,000 United States communities.

=== Permits ===
Under the RCRA, the EPA issues permits to ensure the safe treatment, storage, and disposal of hazardous wastes. In order to receive a permit, the party managing the waste has to meet certain criteria, as specified by the Act. Permits are used to set a minimum baseline of safety standards that must be met in the handling and disposal of waste in order to control this process and ensure a degree of safety is achieved. This is an example of command and control regulation, by which the government specifies certain standards that parties must meet.

=== Technology standards ===
Technology standards are another form of command and control regulation by the government. Technology standards stipulate certain types or levels of technologies that must be employed to ensure the safe storage or treatment of waste. For example, technology standards have been created for the design of landfills and there are requirements for the design of the liners in order to prevent leachate.

=== Performance standards ===
Performance standards dictate maximum levels of emissions that may be released in the process of waste management and disposal. These standards are set by the federal government, but can be made more stringent by states. For example, incinerators may not emit over 180 mg of particulate matter per dry standard cubic meter. Other emissions from incinerators are also regulated.

=== Labeling ===
Different labeling standards are required by the federal government and by some states for different types of waste such as hazardous waste and medical waste. Labeling ensures that those coming into contact with these types of waste are aware of the nature of the waste. In this way, labeling is also intended to help ensure proper handling and disposal.

=== Challenges and goals ===
The EPA has set forth challenges and goals with regards to solid waste. The Resource Conservation Challenge aims to:

- "Prevent pollution and promote reuse and recycling;
- Reduce priority and toxic chemicals in products and waste; and
- Conserve energy and materials."

It has also issued a challenge to increase recycling to encompass 35% of the country's municipal solid waste. The EPA's other three focuses are on recycling electronics, recycling industrial materials, and reducing priority and toxic chemicals. These challenges and goals are supported by voluntary programs and partnerships.

=== Partnerships ===
The EPA has established a number of partnerships with businesses and organizations, industries, states, local governments, tribes, and other entities to reduce and effectively manage waste. Examples of these partnerships are Plug-In To eCycling, the Schools Chemical Cleanout Campaign, and WasteWise. All of these examples aim to meet the goals of the Resource Conservation Challenge. These partnerships are voluntary. Entities may enter into these partnerships because of a variety of expected benefits, including costs savings and improved public image. In another example, EPA and state and tribal representatives jointly developed a framework for industrial waste management aimed to establish a common set of guidelines. Under the Federal Advisory Committee Act, EPA convened a focus group consisting of industry and public stakeholders to provide assistance throughout the industrial waste management process.

=== Information ===
The EPA provides a large amount of information on topics pertaining to waste, such as source reduction and recycling. In this way, the government is working to educate its citizens in order to reduce the amount of waste and ensure its proper disposal in a non coercive manner. This website is also a good source for people looking for instructions on how to properly dispose of items such as compact fluorescent bulbs or electronics.

== United States legislation ==
=== History ===
Federal solid waste law has gone through four major phases. The Solid Waste Disposal Act (SWDA) of 1965 was the first U.S. federal solid waste management law enacted. It focused on research, demonstrations, and training. In a second phase, the Resource Recovery Act of 1970 emphasized reclaiming energy and materials from solid waste instead of dumping. In a third phase, the federal government started playing more active regulatory role, with the Resource Conservation and Recovery Act (RCRA) of 1976. RCRA instituted the first federal permitting program for hazardous waste and it also made open dumping illegal. RCRA focuses only on active and future facilities and does not address abandoned or historical sites which are managed under the Comprehensive Environmental Response, Compensation, and Liability Act (CERCLA) of 1980 - commonly known as Superfund. Implementation of RCRA was relatively slow and Congress reauthorized and strengthened RCRA through the Hazardous and Solid Waste Amendments (HSWA) of 1984. This was the beginning of the fourth phase. The 1984 RCRA Amendments suggested a policy shift away from land disposal and toward more preventive solutions. RCRA has been amended on two occasions since HSWA: the Federal Facility Compliance Act of 1992 which strengthened enforcement of RCRA at federal facilities and the Land Disposal Program Flexibility Act of 1996 which provided regulatory flexibility for land disposal of certain wastes.

Solid waste legislation has been constantly strengthened and improved by the introduction of amendments to the major laws mentioned above and other specific laws. The most important amendments are:

- Resource Recovery Act of 1970 which provides state and local governments with technical and financial help in planning and developing resource recovery and waste disposal systems
- Used Oil Recycling Act of 1980 which defines the terms used oil, recycled oil, lubricating oil, and re-refined oil, and encourages state to use recycled oil
- Solid Waste Disposal Act Amendments of 1980 which targets against hazardous waste dumping
- Superfund Amendments and Reauthorization Act (SARA) of 1986 which amends CERCLA of 1980, increases state involvement in the Superfund program, and encourages greater citizen participation in decision making
- Medical Waste Tracking Act of 1988 created RCRA Subtitle J, which expired on March 22, 1991. See Medical waste.
- Ocean Dumping Ban Act of 1988 which prohibits all municipal sewage sludge and industrial waste dumping into the ocean
- RCRA cleanup reforms I&II of 1999 and 2001 which accelerate the cleanup of hazardous waste facilities regulated under RCRA
- Used Oil Management Standards of 2003 which defines used oil management standards in a more exact manner

Statutes and rules designed to improve community access to information about chemical hazards:

- Emergency Planning and Community Right-To-Know Act (EPCRA), also known as SARA Title III of 1980, which provides for notification of emergency releases of chemicals, and addresses communities' right-to-know about toxic and hazardous chemicals
- RCRA Expanded Public Participation Rule of 1996 which encourages communities' involvement in the process of permitting hazardous waste facilities and expands public access to information about such facilities

Statutes and rules designed to prevent pollution:

- Pollution Prevention Act of 1990 which requires the EPA to establish an Office of Pollution Prevention and the owners and operators of manufacturing facilities to report annually on source reduction and recycling activities
- Hazardous Waste Combustors; Revised Standards; Final Rule - Part 1 of 1998 which provides for a conditional exclusion from RCRA for fuels which are produced from a hazardous waste and promotes the installation of cost effective pollution prevention technologies

=== Federal legislation ===
==== Resource Conservation and Recovery Act (RCRA) ====
Within RCRA, the EPA has three comprehensive waste management programs:

1. Subtitle C - Hazardous waste: The Subtitle C program establishes a system for controlling hazardous waste from its generation until its ultimate disposal ("cradle-to-grave" approach). This program identifies the criteria to determine hazardous waste and establishes requirements for all of the parties: producers, transporters and disposal facilities.
2. Subtitle D - Solid waste: The Subtitle D program establishes a system for controlling (primarily non-hazardous) solid waste, such as household waste. The program provides the states and local governments with guidance, policy and regulations for the efficient waste management.
3. Subtitle I - Underground storage tanks: The Subtitle I program in RCRA regulates toxic substances and petroleum products stored in underground storage tanks (UST). The program establishes requirements for design and operation of UST aimed at preventing accidental spills.

===== Main RCRA accomplishments =====
Some of the main achievements of RCRA since its implementation are given below:

- Established design and performance standards for landfills and treatment technologies;
- Established "cradle-to-grave" tracking of hazardous waste;
- Caused the closure of a large number of mismanaged facilities; two-thirds of non-compliant land disposal facilities were closed;
- Prevented the disposal of untreated wastes into and onto the land;
- Permitted more than 900 hazardous waste management facilities;
- Assessed over 1,600 facilities;
- Authorized 48 states for the base RCRA program.

===== Improvement Areas =====
There are a number of lessons learned post-implementation of RCRA. First of all it appeared that close Congressional oversight could limit flexibility. After 1984, when HSWA were approved, EPA's discretion was influenced by close Congressional oversight. Congress set specific implementation deadlines for the hazardous waste program. The very demanding regulatory development schedule did not allow EPA to pay enough attention to other very important priorities. The important priorities for EPA found by their study are listed below:

- Program evaluation and long-term priorities should be strengthened;
- Old regulations should be revised; New regulations could make it difficult for state programs;
- Stronger focus on environmental data is needed;
- State authorization should be faster;
- Alternates should be examined;
- Potential regulatory overlaps or inconsistencies should be addressed.

=== State legislation ===
Federal guidelines have provided state, tribal, and some local governments regulatory responsibility for ensuring proper management of wastes generated from each source in their region but the programs might vary considerably in their guidelines and implementation. As of 2011, the EPA has authorized forty-eight states, except Alaska and Iowa (Hawaii was added in 2001), to implement the RCRA, meaning the states' regulations must meet at least the requirements set at the federal level and may be more stringent. Many states follow the federal rules for hazardous waste management and also have more stringent state requirements on hazardous and toxic wastes in particular. California, New York and Iowa are some states that have additional requirements. For example, the California Department of Toxic and Hazardous Substances distinguishes discarded mercury-containing products and waste oil as separate groups of hazardous waste.

=== Municipal legislation ===
Municipalities are in charge of local recycling and trash collection. They can choose whether to contract these services out to private companies or not and how to charge for these services. Municipalities also may adopt approaches of converting waste to energy through methods such as generating electricity from landfill gas. Therefore, municipalities play an important role in everyday waste management. There is, of course, a wide variety of implementation across the country.

== Challenges and issues ==
Solid waste management challenges and issues that should be considered while framing solid waste policy include proper waste generation, segregation, collection, transportation, and disposal methods, landfill management, hazardous and other toxic material management, treatment, incineration, recycling and other technology standards, monitoring, evaluation, and continuous improvement methods. In addition to these issues, policy has to address the short term and long-term economic, environmental, and social costs and benefits, funding methods, and roles of various stakeholders.
