= Resource Conservation and Recovery Act =

Federal law in the United States

- Other short titles: Resource Conservation and Recovery Act of 1976
- Long title: An Act to provide technical and financial assistance for the development of management plans and facilities for the recovery of energy and other resources from discarded materials and for the safe disposal of discarded materials, and to regulate the management of hazardous waste.
- Acronyms (colloquial): RCRA
- Nicknames: Solid Waste Utilization Act
- Enacted by: the 94th United States Congress
- Effective: October 21, 1976

Citations
- Public law: 94-580
- Statutes at Large: 90 Stat. 2795

Codification
- Acts amended: Solid Waste Disposal Act of 1965
- Titles amended: 42 U.S.C.: Public Health and Social Welfare
- U.S.C. sections created: 42 U.S.C. ch. 82 § 6901 et seq.

Legislative history
- Introduced in the Senate as S. 2150 by Jennings Randolph (D–WV) on July 21, 1975; Committee consideration by Senate Public Works Committee; House Interstate and Foreign Commerce Committee; Passed the Senate on June 30, 1976 (88-3); Passed the House on September 27, 1976 (367-8, in lieu of H.R. 14496) with amendment; Senate agreed to House amendment on September 30, 1976 (agreed); Signed into law by President Gerald Ford on October 21, 1976

United States Supreme Court cases
- City of Philadelphia v. New Jersey, 430 U.S. 141 (1977); Hallstrom v. Tillamook County, 493 U.S. 20 (1990); Department of Energy v. Ohio, 503 U.S. 607 (1992); City of Chicago v. Environmental Defense Fund, 511 U.S. 328 (1994); Meghrig v. KFC Western, Inc., 516 U.S. 479 (1996); Southern Union Co. v. United States, 567 U.S. 343 (2012)

The Resource Conservation and Recovery Act (RCRA), enacted in 1976, is the primary federal law in the United States governing the disposal of solid waste and hazardous waste.

== History and goals ==
Congress enacted RCRA to address the increasing problems the nation faced from its growing volume of municipal and industrial waste. RCRA was an amendment of the Solid Waste Disposal Act of 1965. The act set national goals for:

- Protecting human health and the natural environment from the potential hazards of waste disposal.
- Energy conservation and natural resources.
- Reducing the amount of waste generated, through source reduction and recycling
- Maintaining environmental health standards.
- Ensuring the management of waste in an environmentally sound manner.

The RCRA program is a joint federal and state endeavor with the U.S. Environmental Protection Agency (EPA) providing basic requirements that states then adopt, adapt, and enforce. RCRA is now most widely known for the regulations promulgated under it that set standards for the treatment, storage, and disposal of hazardous waste in the United States. However, it also plays an integral role in the management of municipal and industrial waste, as well as underground storage tanks.

== Implementation ==
The EPA publishes waste management regulations, which are codified in Title 40 of the Code of Federal Regulations in parts 239 through 282. Regulations regarding management of hazardous waste begin in part 260. States are authorized to operate their own hazardous waste programs, which must be at least as stringent as federal standards, and are tasked with creating state implementation plans for managing solid waste.

In California, the Department of Toxic Substances Control (DTSC) is the primary authority enforcing the RCRA requirements, as well as the California Hazardous Waste Control Law (HWCL) of 1972.

== Provisions ==
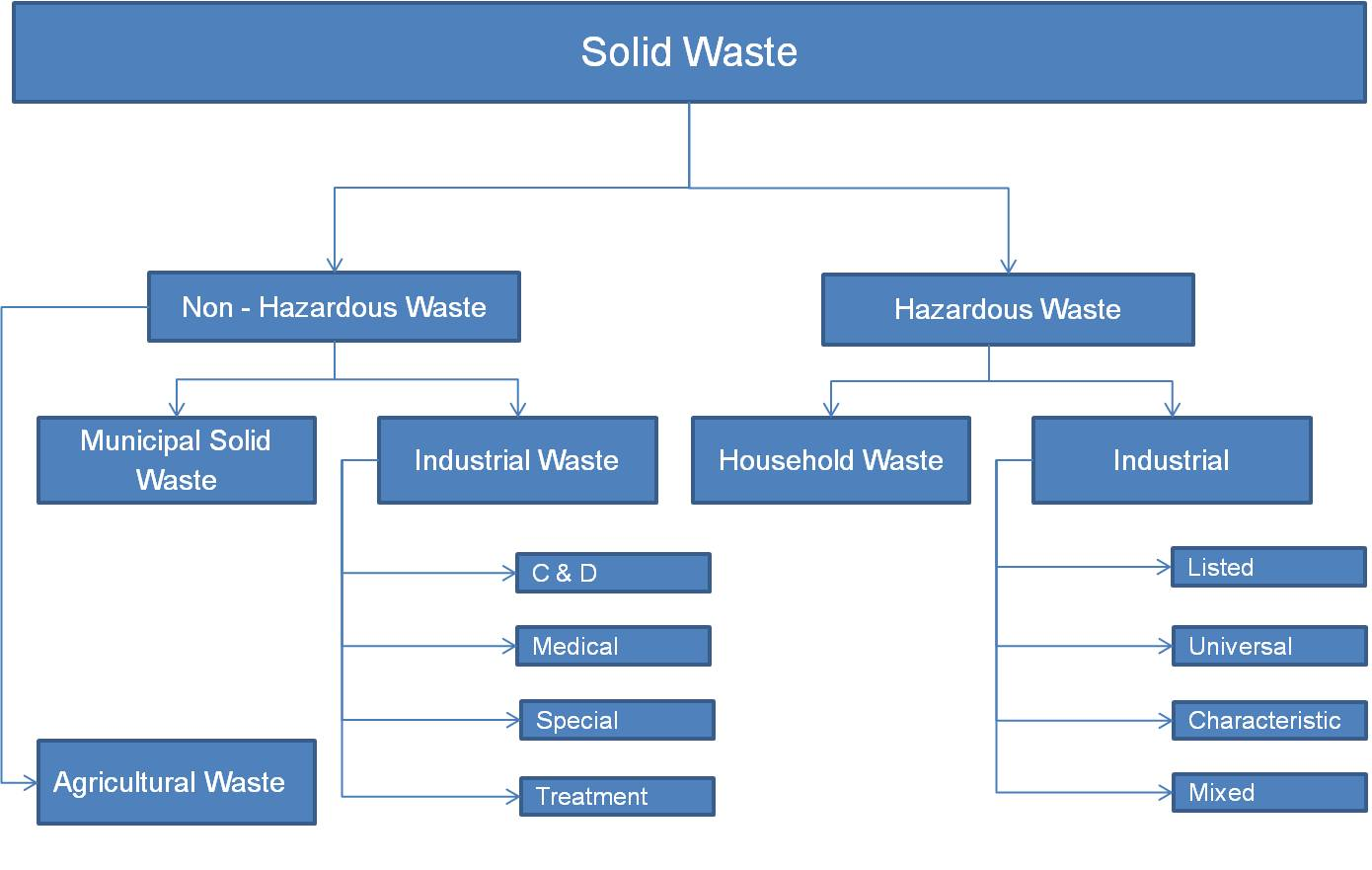
Types of solid waste

=== Subtitle A: General Provisions ===
- Congressional Findings; Objectives and National Policy
- Definitions
- Interstate Cooperation; Application of Act and Integration with Other Acts
- Financial Disclosure; Solid Waste Management Information and Guidelines

=== Subtitle B: Office of Solid Waste; Authorities of the Administrator ===
- Office of Solid Waste and Interagency Coordinating Committee
- Authorities of EPA Administrator
- Resource Recovery and Conservation Panels; Grants
- Annual Report; Office of Ombudsman

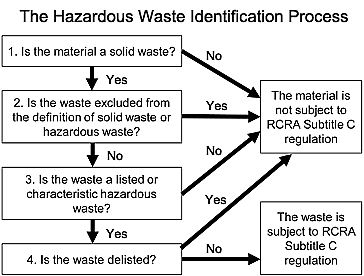
Hazardous waste identification process

=== Subtitle C: "Cradle to Grave" requirements for hazardous waste ===
Arguably the most notable provisions of the RCRA statute are included in Subtitle C, which directs EPA to establish controls on the management of hazardous wastes from their point of generation, through their transportation and treatment, storage and/or disposal. Because RCRA requires controls on hazardous waste generators (i.e., sites that generate hazardous waste), transporters, and treatment, storage and disposal facilities (i.e., facilities that ultimately treat/dispose of or recycle the hazardous waste), the overall regulatory framework has become known as the "cradle to grave" system. States are authorized to implement their own hazardous waste programs. The statute imposes stringent recordkeeping and reporting requirements on generators, transporters, and operators of treatment, storage and disposal facilities handling hazardous waste.

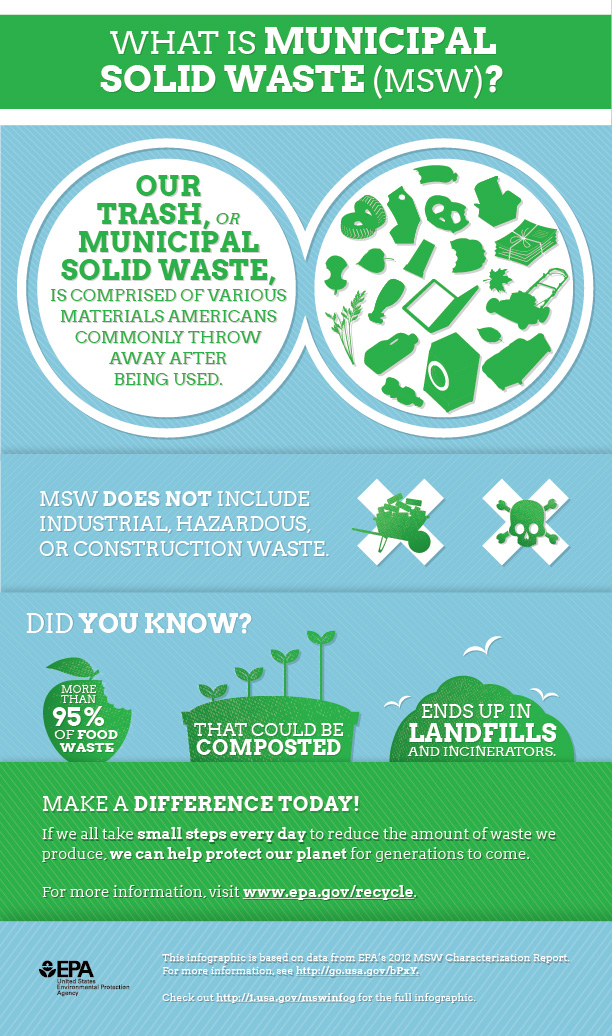
EPA graphic explaining municipal solid waste

=== Subtitle D: Non-hazardous Solid Wastes ===
Subtitle D provides criteria for landfills and other waste disposal facilities, and banned open landfills. EPA published its initial standards in 1979 for "sanitary" landfills that receive municipal solid waste. The "solid waste" definition includes garbage (e.g., food containers, coffee grounds), non-recycled household appliances, residue from incinerated automobile tires, refuse such as metal scrap, construction materials, and sludge from industrial and sewage treatment plants and drinking water treatment plants. Subtitle D also exempted certain hazardous wastes from the Subtitle C regulations, such as hazardous wastes from households and from conditionally exempt small quantity generators.

==== Special wastes ====
In 1980 Congress designated several kinds of industrial wastes as "special wastes", which are exempt from Subtitle C, including oil and gas exploration and production wastes (such as drill cuttings, produced water, and drilling fluids), coal combustion residuals generated by electric power plants and other industries, mining waste, and cement kiln dust. In response to the 2008 Kingston Fossil Plant coal fly ash slurry spill and similar incidents, EPA issued a series of regulations pertaining to the management of coal ash, beginning in 2015. See Solid Waste Disposal Amendments of 1980.

=== Subtitle E: Department of Commerce responsibilities ===
- Development of Specifications for secondary materials; Development of markets for recovered material.
- Technology promotion

=== Subtitle F: Federal responsibilities ===
- Application of Federal, State and Local Law to Federal Facilities
- Federal procurement
- Cooperation with EPA; Applicability of solid waste disposal guidelines to executive agencies

=== Subtitle G: Miscellaneous provisions ===
- Whistleblower protection. Employees in the United States who believe they were fired or suffered another adverse action related to enforcement of this law have 30 days to file a written complaint with the Occupational Safety and Health Administration.
- Citizen Suits; Imminent Hazard suits
- Petition for regulations; Public participation

=== Subtitle H: Research, Development, Demonstration and Information ===
- Research, Demonstrations, Training; Special Studies
- Coordination, collection, dissemination of information

=== Subtitle I: Underground Storage Tanks ===
Background

The operation of underground storage tanks (USTs) became subject to the RCRA regulatory program with enactment of the Hazardous and Solid Waste Amendments of 1984 (HSWA). At that time there were about 2.1 million tanks subject to federal regulation, and the EPA program led to closure and removal of most substandard tanks. As of September 2025 there were 533,277 active USTs at approximately 190,000 sites subject to federal regulation.

Regulatory requirements

The federal UST regulations cover tanks storing petroleum or listed hazardous substances, and define the types of tanks permitted. EPA established a tank notification system to track UST status. UST regulatory programs are principally administered by state and U.S. territorial agencies.

The regulations set standards for:

- Groundwater monitoring
- Secondary spill containment
- Release detection, prevention and correction
- Spill prevention
- Overfill prevention (for petroleum products)
- Restrictions on land disposal of untreatable hazardous waste products.

The Superfund Amendments and Reauthorization Act of 1986 (SARA) required owners and operators of USTs to ensure corrective action is completed when a tank is in need of repair, or removal, when it is necessary to protect human health and the environment. The amendments established a trust fund to pay for the cleanup of leaking UST sites where responsible parties cannot be identified.

It is also recommended that above-ground storage tanks be used whenever possible.

=== Subtitle J: Medical Waste (expired) ===
RCRA Subtitle J regulated medical waste in four states (New York, New Jersey, Connecticut, Rhode Island) and Puerto Rico, and expired on March 22, 1991. (See Medical Waste Tracking Act.) State environmental and health agencies regulate medical waste, rather than EPA. Other federal agencies have issued safety regulations governing the handling of medical waste, including the Centers for Disease Control and Prevention, Occupational Safety and Health Administration, and the Food and Drug Administration.

== Amendments and related legislation ==
=== Solid Waste Disposal Amendments of 1980 ===
Congress exempted several types of wastes from classification as hazardous under Subtitle C in its 1980 amendment to RCRA. The Solid Waste Disposal Amendments of 1980 designated the following categories as "special wastes" and not subject to the stricter permitting requirements of Subtitle C:

- coal combustion residuals (CCR) generated by electric power plants and other industries, including fly ash, bottom ash, slag waste and flue-gas desulfurization wastes
- mining waste from ore mines and mineral mines
- cement kiln dust
- drilling fluid, produced water, and other wastes from oil and gas wells.

These legislative exemptions, known as the "Bevill exclusion" and the "Bentsen exclusion", were intended to be temporary, pending studies conducted by EPA and subsequent determinations as to whether any of these waste categories should be classified as hazardous. In its reviews following the 1980 amendments, EPA determined that most of the exempted waste types would continue to be classified as non-hazardous.

==== Regulations ====
After the Kingston Fossil Plant coal fly ash slurry spill in 2008, EPA began developing comprehensive ash pond (surface impoundment) regulations. EPA published a CCR regulation in 2015 to restrict the continued use of ash ponds by coal-fired power plants. In response to litigation and a court remand, EPA published its "CCR Part A" rule on August 28, 2020. This rule required all unlined ash ponds to be retrofit with liners or close by April 11, 2021; although some facilities would be allowed to apply to obtain additional time—up to 2028—to find alternatives for managing ash wastes. The "CCR Part B" rule was published on November 12, 2020, allowing certain facilities to use an alternative liner, based on a demonstration that human health and the environment will not be affected. Several facilities have applied for alternate liner demonstrations, but no final determinations have been made by EPA as of early 2026.

In May 2024 EPA published a final rule for active and inactive CCR facilities, including groundwater monitoring, corrective action, closure, and post-closure care requirements.

=== Superfund ===
The Comprehensive Environmental Response, Compensation, and Liability Act (CERCLA), also known as "Superfund", was enacted in 1980 to address the problem of remediating abandoned hazardous waste sites, by establishing legal liability, as well as a trust fund for cleanup activities. In general CERCLA applies to contaminated sites, while RCRA's focus is on controlling the ongoing generation and management of particular waste streams. RCRA, like CERCLA, has provisions to require cleanup of contaminated sites that occurred in the past.

=== Hazardous and Solid Waste Amendments of 1984 ===
In 1984 Congress expanded the scope of RCRA with the enactment of Hazardous and Solid Waste Amendments (HSWA). The amendments strengthened the law by covering underground storage tanks, small quantity generators of hazardous waste and establishing requirements for hazardous waste incinerators, and the closing of substandard landfills.

=== Land Disposal Program Flexibility Act of 1996 ===
The Land Disposal Program Flexibility Act of 1996 allowed some flexibility in the procedures for land disposal of certain wastes. For example, a waste is not subject to land disposal restrictions if it is sent to an industrial wastewater treatment facility, a municipal sewage treatment plant, or is treated in a "zero discharge" facility.

== Treatment, storage, and disposal facility permits ==
Treatment, storage, and disposal facilities (TSDFs) manage hazardous waste under RCRA Subtitle C and generally must have a permit in order to operate. While most facilities have RCRA permits, some continue to operate under what is called "interim status". Interim status requirements appear in 40 CFR Part 265.

The permitting requirements for TSDFs appear in 40 CFR Parts 264 and 270. TSDFs manage (treat, store, or dispose) hazardous waste in units that may include: container storage areas, tanks, surface impoundments, waste piles, land treatment units, landfills, incinerators, containment buildings, and/or drip pads. The unit-specific permitting and operational requirements are described in further detail in 40 CFR Part 264, Subparts J through DD.

== Case law ==
City of Philadelphia v. New Jersey, 437 U.S. 617 (1978). The United States Supreme Court held that states could not discriminate against another state's articles of commerce. A New Jersey statute that prohibited the importation of waste that originated or was collected outside New Jersey was held to violate the Commerce Clause of the United States Constitution.

Hallstrom v. Tillamook County, 493 U.S. 20 (1990). The Supreme Court held that a citizen suit under the RCRA must be dismissed if the plaintiff fails to meet the statute's notice and 60-day delay requirements.

Department of Energy v. Ohio, 503 U.S. 607 (1992). The Supreme Court held that Congress did not waive the federal government's sovereign immunity from liability for civil fines imposed by a state for past violations of the Clean Water Act (CWA) or RCRA.

Meghrig v. KFC Western, Inc., 516 U.S. 479 (1996). The Supreme Court held that the RCRA does not authorize a citizen suit to recover past cleanup costs when the toxic waste does not, at the time of suit, continue to pose an endangerment to health or the environment.

Southern Union Co. v. United States, 567 U.S. 343 (2012). The Supreme Court held that any fact, other than a prior conviction, that increases the penalty for a crime beyond the statutory maximum must be submitted to the jury and determined beyond a reasonable doubt.

== See also ==
- 1976 in the environment
- Clean Water Act
- Formerly Used Defense Sites
- Hazardous waste in the United States
- Solid waste policy in the United States
- United States energy law
- Uranium Mill Tailings Radiation Control Act
