= Underground storage tank =

Storage tank that is partially or fully underground

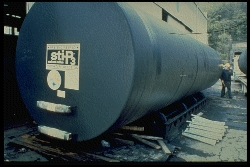
A horizontal cylindrical steel tank with a factory-applied coating and galvanic anodes prior to installation underground.

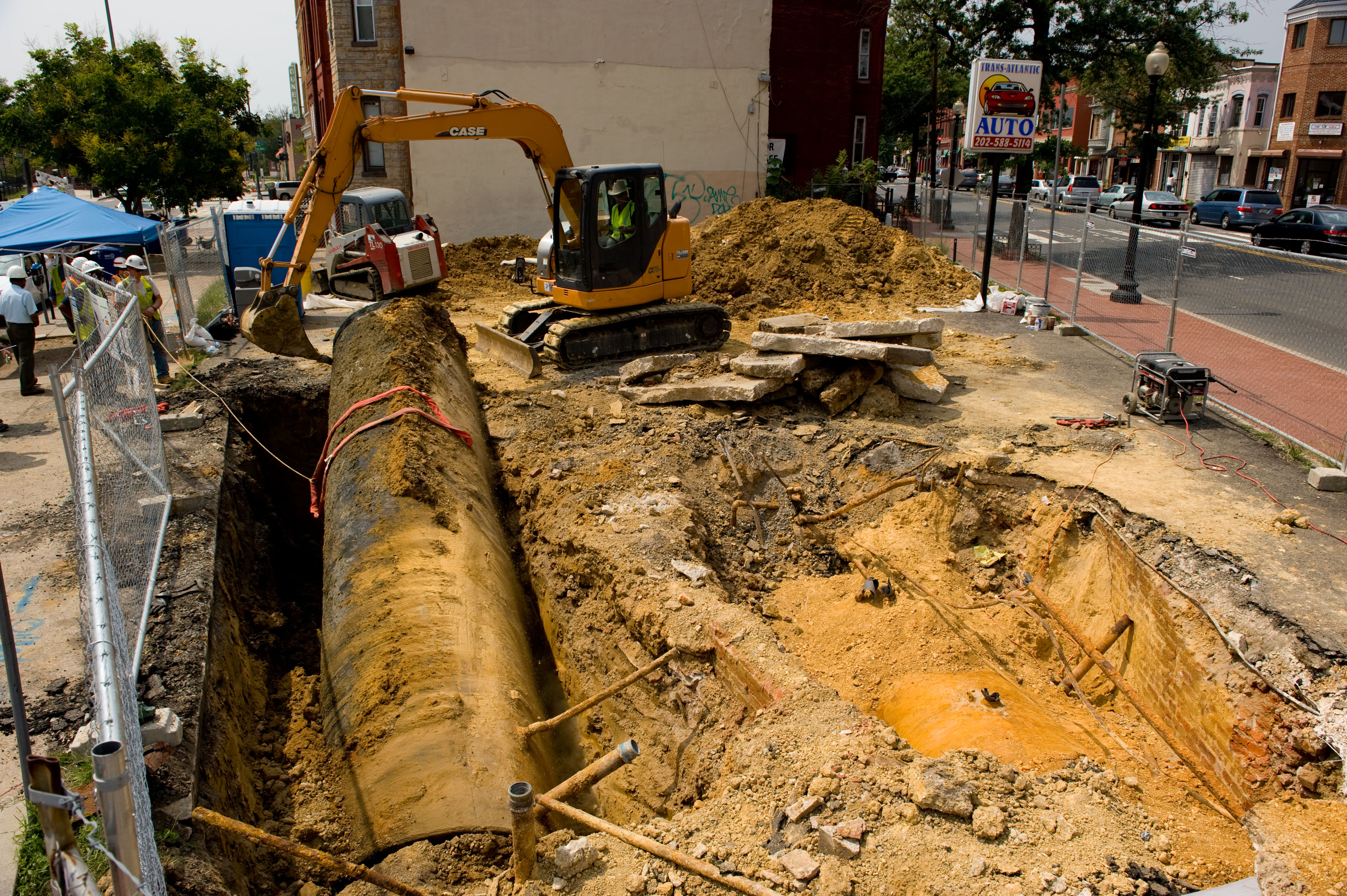
Underground storage tank removal in Washington, D.C.

An underground storage tank (UST) is, according to United States federal regulations, a storage tank, including any underground piping connected to the tank, that has at least 10 percent of its volume underground.

== Definition and regulation in U.S. federal law ==
"Underground storage tank" or "UST" means any one or combination of tanks including connected underground pipes that is used to contain regulated substances, and the volume of which including the volume of underground pipes is 10 percent or more beneath the surface of the ground. This does not include, among other things, any farm or residential tank of 1,100 gallons or less capacity used for storing motor fuel for noncommercial purposes, tanks for storing heating oil for consumption on the premises, or septic tanks.

USTs are regulated in the United States by the U.S. Environmental Protection Agency to prevent the leaking of petroleum or other hazardous substances and the resulting contamination of groundwater and soil. In 1984, U.S. Congress amended the Resource Conservation Recovery Act to include Subtitle I: Underground Storage Tanks, calling on the U.S. Environmental Protection Agency (EPA) to regulate the tanks. In 1985, when it was launched, there were more than 2 million tanks in the country and more than 750,000 owners and operators. The program was given 90 staff to oversee this responsibility. In September 1988, the EPA published initial underground storage tank regulations, including a 10-year phase-in period that required all operators to upgrade their USTs with spill prevention and leak detection equipment.

For USTs in service in the United States, the EPA and states collectively require tank operators to take financial responsibility for any releases or leaks associated with the operation of those below ground tanks. As a condition to keep a tank in operation a demonstrated ability to pay for any release must be shown via UST insurance, a bond, or some other ability to pay.

EPA updated UST and state program approval regulations in 2015, the first major changes since 1988. The revisions increase the emphasis on properly operating and maintaining UST equipment. The revisions will help prevent and detect UST releases, which are a leading source of groundwater contamination. The revisions will also help ensure all USTs in the United States, including those in Indian country, meet the same minimum standards. The changes established federal requirements that are similar to key portions of the Energy Policy Act of 2005. In addition, EPA added new operation and maintenance requirements and addressed UST systems deferred in the 1988 UST regulation. The changes:

- Added secondary containment requirements for new and replaced tanks and piping
- Added operator training requirements
- Added periodic operation and maintenance requirements for UST systems
- Added requirements to ensure UST system compatibility before storing certain biofuel blends
- Removed past deferrals for emergency generator tanks, field constructed tanks, and airport hydrant systems
- Updated codes of practice
- Made editorial and technical corrections.

== Tank types ==
Underground storage tanks fall into four different types:

1. Steel/aluminum tanks, made by manufacturers in most states and conforming to standards set by the Steel Tank Institute.
2. Composite overwrapped, a metal tank (aluminum/steel) with filament windings like glass fiber/aramid or carbon fiber or a plastic compound around the metal cylinder for corrosion protection and to form an interstitial space.
3. Tanks made from composite material, fiberglass/aramid or carbon fiber with a metal liner (aluminum or steel). See metal matrix composite.
4. Composite tanks such as carbon fiber with a polymer liner (thermoplastic). See rotational molding and fibre-reinforced plastic (FRP).

Underground storage tanks for water are traditionally called cisterns and are usually constructed from bricks and mortar or concrete.

== Petroleum underground storage tanks ==
Petroleum USTs are used throughout North America at automobile filling stations and by the US military. Many have leaked, allowing petroleum to contaminate the soil and groundwater and enter as vapor into buildings, ending up as brownfields or Superfund sites. Many USTs installed before 1980 consisted of bare steel pipes, which corrode over time. Faulty installation can also cause structural failure of the tank or piping, causing leaks.

=== Regulation in the US ===
The 1984 Hazardous and Solid Waste Amendments to the Resource Conservation and Recovery Act (RCRA) required EPA to develop regulations for the underground storage of motor fuels to minimize and prevent environmental damage, by mandating owners and operators of UST systems to verify, maintain, and clean up sites damaged by petroleum contamination.

In December 1988, EPA regulations asking owners to locate, remove, upgrade, or replace underground storage tanks became effective. Each state was given authority to establish such a program within its own jurisdiction, to compensate owners for the cleanup of underground petroleum leaks, to set standards and licensing for installers, and to register and inspect underground tanks.

Most upgrades to USTs consisted of the installation of corrosion control (cathodic protection, interior lining, or a combination of cathodic protection and interior lining), overfill protection (to prevent overfills of the tank during tank filling operations), spill containment (to catch spills when filling), and leak detection for both the tank and piping.

Many USTs were removed without replacement during the 10-year program. Many thousands of old underground tanks were replaced with newer tanks made of corrosion resistant materials (such as fiberglass, steel clad with a thick FRP shell, and well-coated steel with galvanic anodes) and others constructed as double walled tanks to form an interstice between two tank walls (a tank within a tank) which allowed for the detection of leaks from the inner or outer tank wall through monitoring of the interstice using vacuum, pressure or a liquid sensor probe. Piping was replaced during the same period with much of the new piping being double-wall construction and made of fiberglass or plastic materials.

Tank monitoring systems capable of detecting small leaks (required to detect 0.1 gallons-per-hour with a probability of 95% or greater and a probability of false alarm of 5% or less) were installed and other methods were adopted to alert the tank operator of leaks and potential leaks.

U.S. regulations required that UST cathodic protection systems be tested by a cathodic protection expert (minimum every three years) and that systems be monitored to ensure continued compliant operation.

Some industrial owners, who previously stored fuel in underground tanks, switched to above-ground tanks to avoid environmental regulations that require monitoring of fuel storage. Many states, however, do not permit above-ground storage of motor fuel for resale to the public.

The EPA Underground Storage Tank Program is considered to have been very successful. The national inventory of underground tanks has been reduced by more than half, and most of the rest have been replaced or upgraded to much safer standards. Of the approximately one million underground storage tanks sites in the United States as of 2008, most of which handled some type of fuel, an estimated 500,000 have had leaks. As of 2009, there were approximately 600,000 active USTs at 223,000 sites subject to federal regulation.

In 2012, EPA published how to screen buildings vulnerable to petroleum vapor intrusion, and in June 2015, U.S. EPA finally released its "Technical Guide for Assessing and Mitigating the Vapor Intrusion Pathway from Subsurface Vapor Sources to Indoor Air" and "Technical Guide For Addressing Petroleum Vapor Intrusion At Leaking Underground Storage Tank Sites".

=== Definition in the UK ===
Similarly to the US, the UK defines an underground tank as having 10% of its combined potential volume below the ground.

=== Decommissioning an underground tank in the UK ===
The requirements set by The Environment Agency for Decommissioning an underground tank apply to all underground storage tanks and not just those used for the storage of fuels. They give extensive guidance in The Blue Book and PETEL 65/34. The Environment Agency states that any tank no longer in use should be immediately decommissioned. This process includes both the closing and removal of a UST system (the tank and any ancillaries connected to it) as a whole and the replacing of individual tanks or lengths of pipe. Regardless of whether the decommissioning of the tank is permanent or temporary; it must be ensured that the tank and all components don't cause pollution. This is true of the removal and of any filling of the tank with inert material.

The Decommissioning of a tank can be via removal from the ground after any volatile gas or liquid has been removed. This is called bottoming and degassing the tank. The other option involved filling the tank with either:

- sand and cement slurry
- hydrophobic foam
- foamed concrete

If any plan is made to leave the tank on site, the owner will be responsible for keeping record of:

- tank's capacity
- product contained
- method used to decommission the tank, if any
- date of decommissioning

If any tanks and their pipework have been deemed unsuitable for petroleum spirits then they shouldn't be used for the storage of any hydrocarbon based products without first checking their integrity.

== See also ==
- Environmental impact of the petroleum industry
