= John Shimkus =

American politician (born 1958)

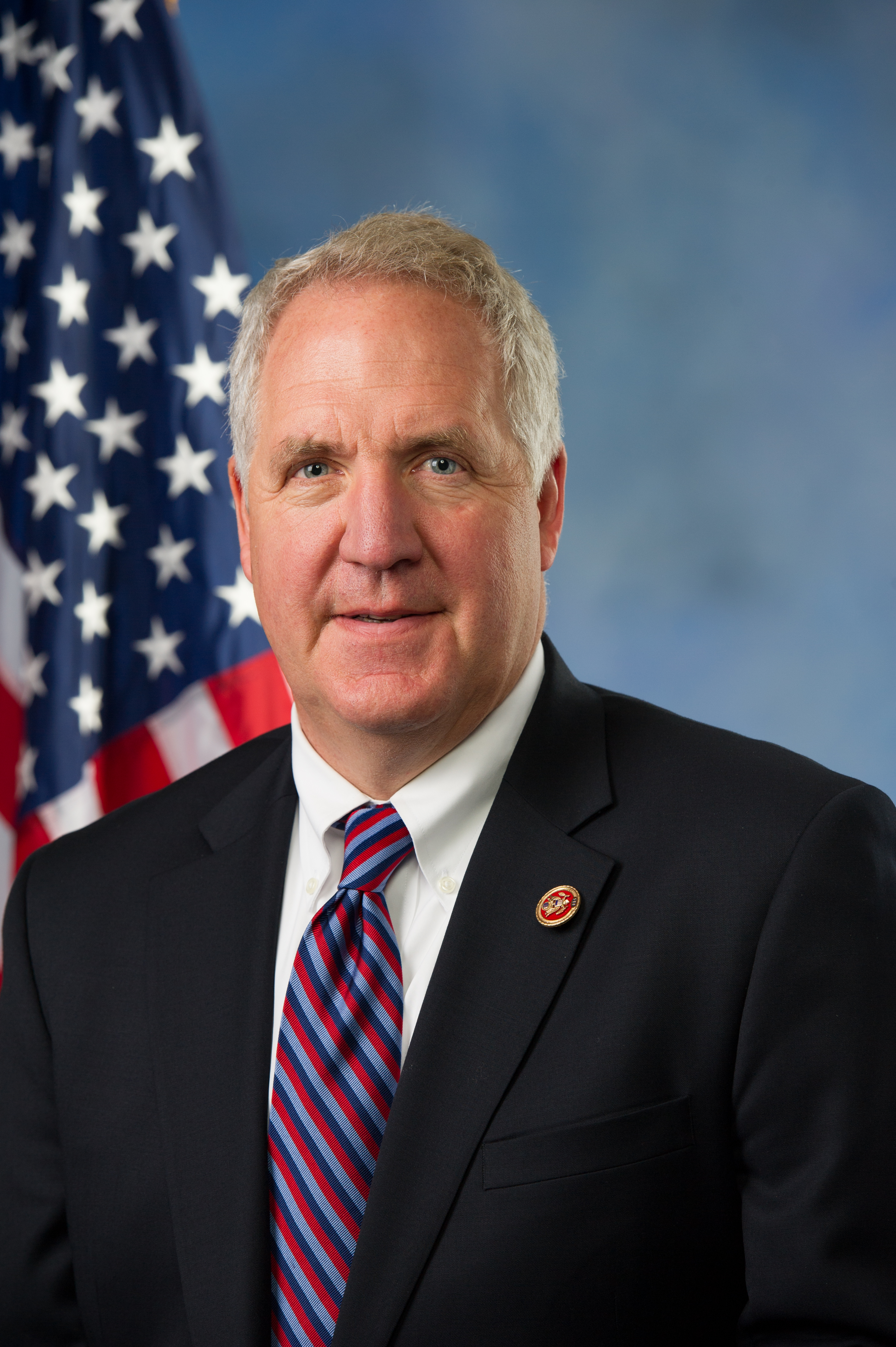

Member of the U.S. House of Representatives from Illinois
- In office January 3, 1997 – January 3, 2021
- Preceded by: Dick Durbin
- Succeeded by: Mary Miller
- Constituency: 20th district (1997–2003); 19th district (2003–2013); 15th district (2013–2021)

Personal details
- Born: John Mondy Shimkus; February 21, 1958 (age 68) Collinsville, Illinois, U.S.
- Party: Republican
- Spouse: Karen Muth
- Children: 3
- Education: United States Military Academy (BS); Southern Illinois University, Edwardsville (MBA)

Military service
- Branch/service: United States Army
- Years of service: 1980–1986 (active); 1986–2008 (reserve)
- Rank: Lieutenant Colonel
- Unit: United States Army Reserve
- Shimkus's voice Shimkus supporting the Frank R. Lautenberg Chemical Safety for the 21st Century Act. Recorded May 24, 2016

John Mondy Shimkus (/ˈʃɪmkəs/, born February 21, 1958) is an American politician who served as a U.S. representative from 1997 to 2021, representing the 20th, 19th and 15th congressional districts of Illinois.

He was first elected in 1996, succeeding Dick Durbin, who was elected in the 1996 Senate election. Shimkus is a member of the Republican Party. On August 30, 2019, he announced that he would not seek re-election for his seat in 2020 and was succeeded by fellow Republican Mary Miller.

== Early life, education, and career ==
Shimkus is a lifelong resident of Collinsville, part of the Metro East portion of the St. Louis metropolitan area. He is the son of Kathleen N. (née Mondy) and Gene L. Shimkus. His paternal grandfather was of Lithuanian descent. Shimkus earned his bachelor's degree at the United States Military Academy. After serving his five-year United States Army commitment, he entered the United States Army Reserve, retiring in 2008 as a lieutenant colonel. While in the U.S. Army, Shimkus earned the Expert Infantry Badge, Ranger Tab, and Parachutist Badge. He served overseas with the 54th Infantry Regiment in West Germany.

Shimkus earned a teaching certificate from Christ College Irvine (now Concordia University Irvine) and began teaching at Metro East Lutheran High School in Edwardsville. He earned an MBA from Southern Illinois University Edwardsville in 1987. Shimkus first ran for office in 1989, when he was elected a Collinsville Township trustee. A year later, he was elected as Madison County treasurer—the first Republican elected to a countywide post in 10 years. In 1994, Shimkus became the first Republican to be re-elected as county treasurer in 60 years.

== U.S. House of Representatives ==
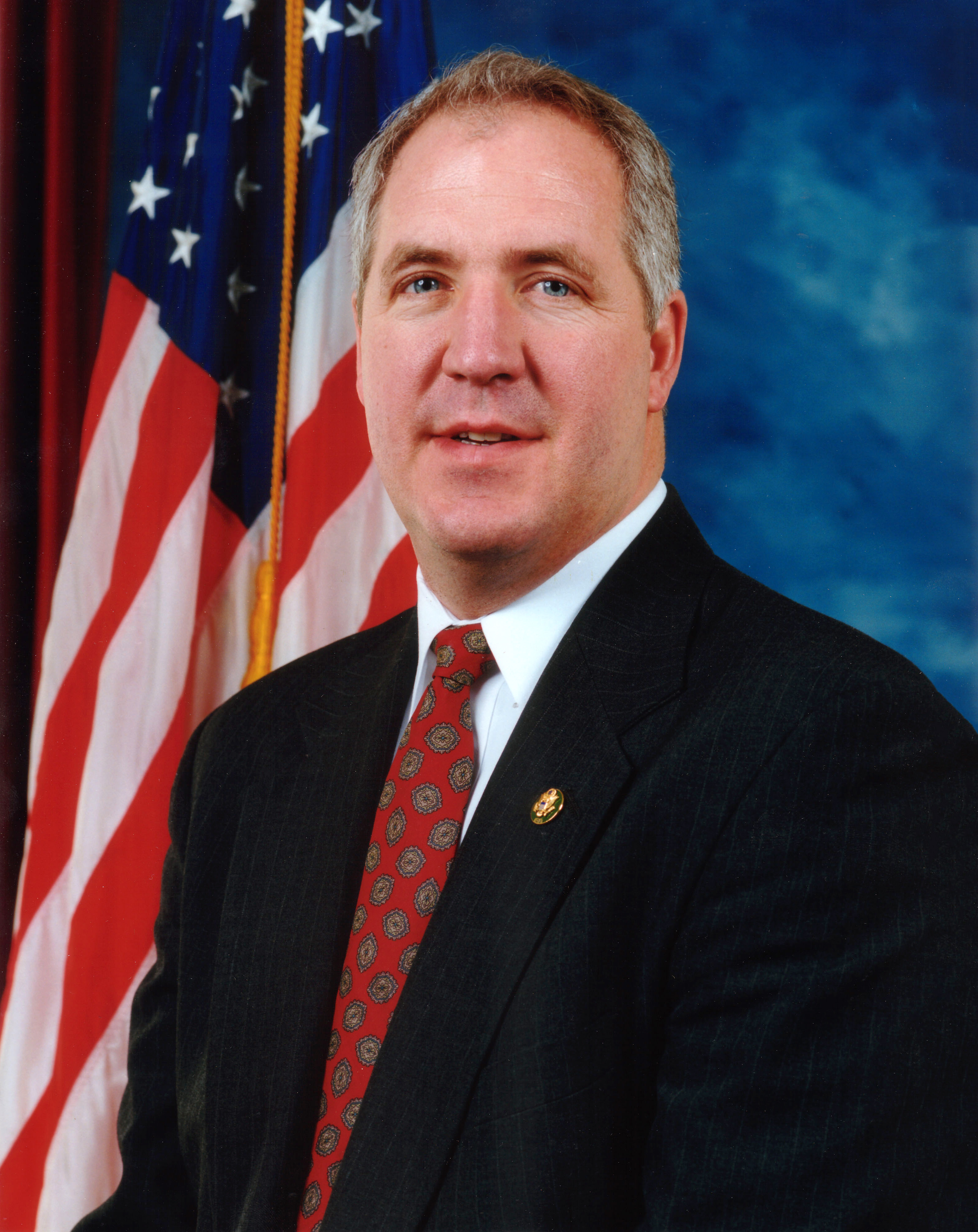
Earlier official photo of Shimkus

=== Record ===
Shimkus was a key leader in the effort to reform the Toxic Substances Control Act, which was amended in 2016 by the Lautenberg Chemical Safety Act. Shimkus voted in favor of the Tax Cuts and Jobs Act of 2017.

=== Committee assignments ===
- Committee on Energy and Commerce
  - Subcommittee on Communications and Technology
  - Subcommittee on Energy and Power
  - Subcommittee on Environment and Economy (Ranking Member)
  - Subcommittee on Health
- Republican Study Committee

=== Caucus memberships ===
- House Baltic Caucus
- Congressional NextGen 9-1-1 Caucus

== Political positions ==
=== Climate change ===
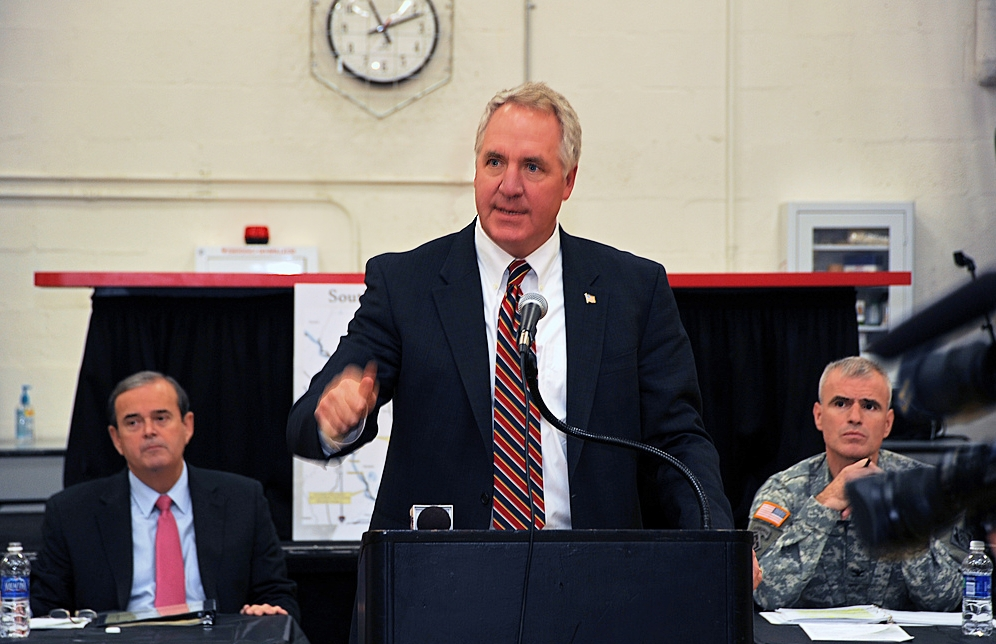
Congressman John Shimkus speaks at Southern Illinois Levee Summit regarding the importance of flood risk management and regional levee concerns with Congressman Jerry Costello and Army Corps of Engineers, St. Louis district official

On March 25, 2009, in introductory remarks made to Christopher Monckton, 3rd Viscount Monckton of Brenchley, during a United States House Energy Subcommittee on Energy and Environment hearing, he made the following statement regarding the role of carbon dioxide in global warming:

It's plant food ... So if we decrease the use of carbon dioxide, are we not taking away plant food from the atmosphere? ... So all our good intentions could be for naught. In fact, we could be doing just the opposite of what the people who want to save the world are saying.

Shimkus has quoted the Bible to allay concerns of global warming induced rise in sea levels, stating that God had promised mankind through Noah that the earth would never again be destroyed by a flood. He acknowledged that climate change is real, but questioned the benefit of spending taxpayer money on "something that you cannot stop versus the changes that have been occurring forever".

=== Food safety ===
Shimkus has been a proponent of legislation to increase the ability of the Food and Drug Administration to institute recalls of tainted foods. He has served as one of the chief Republican negotiators on the FDA Food Safety Modernization Act, which was passed by Congress and signed by the president. Of the bill, he said: "When you're talking about the health and safety of folks, if the FDA has enough evidence to make a declaration of recall, I think that most Americans would support the government having that authority."

=== Keystone Pipeline ===
In May 2013, Shimkus stated he would renew his support for the Keystone Pipeline. The project would be an oil pipeline, bringing Canadian crude oil through the Midwest, including Illinois. As a supporter, he stated that he would rather see Canada as an energy partner than ship in oil from overseas.

=== National security ===
Shimkus spoke positively of President Donald Trump's 2017 executive order to temporarily curtail immigration from specified countries until better screening methods are devised. He stated that "This temporary halt will give Congress and the new Administration time to evaluate and improve the vetting process, and in the meantime gives Secretary Kelly authority to grant exceptions to the restrictions as needed. One of those exceptions must be to green card holders, who have already undergone extensive screening." In October 2019, he criticized Trump for withdrawing U.S. troops from Syria, and resigned as a co-chair for Trump's 2020 campaign in Illinois.

== Political campaigns ==
In 1992, while still serving as Madison County treasurer, he won the Republican nomination to run for the U.S. House seat in what was then the 20th district. He was defeated by 10-year Democratic incumbent Dick Durbin.

Four years later, Durbin gave up the seat to make what would be a successful run for the United States Senate. Shimkus won a crowded six-way primary, and faced State Representative Jay C. Hoffman in a close general election, which Shimkus won by just over 1,200 votes.

However, he would never face another general election contest nearly that close. He faced only one credible Democratic opponent since his initial reelection, in 2002. That year, Illinois lost a district as a result of the 2000 census, and his district was merged with the 19th district, then held by two-term Democratic representative David Phelps. The new district retained Phelps' district number, but was geographically and demographically more similar to the old 20th district, as Shimkus retained 60% of his former territory. The campaign was very bitter, with both men accusing the other's staffers of stalking their families. Despite a Democratic wave that swept through most of the state, with Democrats flipping the Governorship and State Senate, Shimkus defeated Phelps with 55% of the vote. This was the only time he received below 60% in a reelection bid.

Shimkus announced in September 2005, that he would run for reelection in 2008, despite making a pledge when first elected in 1996 not to stay in office for more than 12 years.

In 2012, Shimkus' district was renumbered as the 15th district after Illinois lost another district. It lost much of its northern portion to the 13th district, previously numbered as 15th, which was ultimately won by his former projects director, Rodney Davis. The old 19th had been trending Republican over the years, like southern Illinois as a whole. However, the new 15th was, on paper, one of the most Republican districts in the Midwest. Shimkus was reelected four more times from this district with over 70 percent of the vote.

When seeking his 11th term in 2016, Shimkus faced Illinois State Senator Kyle McCarter in the Republican primary. McCarter ran to the political right of Shimkus and criticized his accommodation with the Obama administration as well as national Republican party leadership. No other party even put up a candidate, meaning whoever won the primary would be assured of victory in November. Shimkus won the primary with 60.4% of the vote to McCarter's 39.6%. He then won the general election unopposed.

FEC records show that the John S. Fund, the PAC for Shimkus, contributed to former Republican House Majority Leader Tom DeLay in 2005. The fund also made contributions to Peter Roskam, a Republican candidate for the House from Illinois's 6th district, from 2005 to 2008 and to David McSweeney, a Republican candidate for the House from Illinois's 8th district, in 2006. In 2006, the funds treasurer, lobbyist Mark Valente, resigned. Shimkus earlier said he was considering removing Valente, but he did not want to act too quickly because it might suggest there was something improper about their relationship.

== Electoral history ==
The 20th district was eliminated after the 2000 census due to reapportionment and Illinois' loss of a U.S. House seat, which is why Shimkus faced David D. Phelps, incumbent of the 19th district, in the 2002 election. The 19th district was eliminated after the 2010 census, so Shimkus ran in the redistricted 15th district. The 15th district includes a large part of southern and south-western Illinois and a small part of the Metro East, where Shimkus resides.

Illinois 20th Congressional District General Election, 1992
Party	Candidate	Votes	%
Democratic	Richard J. Durbin (incumbent)	154,869	56.50
Republican	John M. Shimkus	119,219	43.50
Total votes		274,088	100.0

Illinois 20th Congressional District General Election, 1996
Party	Candidate	Votes	%
Republican	John M. Shimkus	120,926	50.26
Democratic	Jay C. Hoffman	119,688	49.74
Write-in votes	Write-in	4	0.00
Total votes		240,618	100.0

Illinois 20th Congressional District General Election, 1998
Party	Candidate	Votes	%
Republican	John M. Shimkus (incumbent)	121,103	61.29
Democratic	Rick Verticchio	76,475	38.71
Total votes		197,578	100.0

Illinois 20th Congressional District General Election, 2000
Party	Candidate	Votes	%
Republican	John M. Shimkus (incumbent)	161,393	63.10
Democratic	Jeffrey S. Cooper	94,382	36.90
Total votes		255,775	100.0

Illinois 19th Congressional District General Election, 2002
Party	Candidate	Votes	%
Republican	John M. Shimkus	133,956	54.79
Democratic	David D. Phelps (incumbent)	110,517	45.21
Total votes		244,473	100.0

Illinois 19th Congressional District General Election, 2004
Party	Candidate	Votes	%
Republican	John M. Shimkus (incumbent)	213,451	69.36
Democratic	Tim Bagwell	94,303	30.64
Total votes		307,754	100.0

Illinois 19th Congressional District Republican Primary, 2006
Party	Candidate	Votes	%
Republican	John M. Shimkus (incumbent)	42,588	99.83
Republican	Don Grimes	74	0.17
Total votes		42,662	100.0

Illinois 19th Congressional District General Election, 2006
Party	Candidate	Votes	%
Republican	John M. Shimkus (incumbent)	143,491	60.71
Democratic	Danny L. Stover	92,861	39.29
Total votes		236,352	100.0

Illinois 19th Congressional District General Election, 2008
Party	Candidate	Votes	%
Republican	John M. Shimkus (incumbent)	203,434	64.46
Democratic	Daniel Davis	105,338	33.38
Green	Troy Dennis	6,817	2.16
Total votes		315,589	100.0

Illinois 19th Congressional District Republican Primary, 2010
Party	Candidate	Votes	%
Republican	John M. Shimkus (incumbent)	48,680	85.34
Republican	Michael Firsching	8,363	14.66
Total votes		57,043	100.0

Illinois 19th Congressional District General Election, 2010
Party	Candidate	Votes	%
Republican	John M. Shimkus (incumbent)	166,166	71.22
Democratic	Tim Bagwell	67,132	28.78
Total votes		233,298	100.0

Illinois 15th Congressional District General Election, 2012
Party	Candidate	Votes	%
Republican	John M. Shimkus	205,775	68.61
Democratic	Angela Michael	94,162	31.39
Total votes		299,937	100.0

Illinois 15th Congressional District General Election, 2014
Party	Candidate	Votes	%
Republican	John M. Shimkus (incumbent)	166,274	74.92
Democratic	Eric Thorsland	55,652	25.08
Total votes		221,926	100.0

Illinois 15th Congressional District Republican Primary, 2016
Party	Candidate	Votes	%
Republican	John M. Shimkus (incumbent)	76,547	60.37
Republican	Kyle McCarter	50,245	39.63
Total votes		126,792	100.0

Illinois 15th Congressional District General Election, 2016
Party	Candidate	Votes	%
Republican	John M. Shimkus (incumbent)	274,554	100.0
Total votes		274,554	100.0

Illinois 15th Congressional District General Election, 2018
Party	Candidate	Votes	%
Republican	John M. Shimkus (incumbent)	181,294	70.93
Democratic	Kevin Gaither	74,309	29.07
Write-in votes	Tim E. Buckner	5	0.00
Total votes		255,608	100.0

== Personal life ==
Shimkus has been married to the former Karen Muth since 1987. They have three children: David, Joshua, and Daniel. They are members of Holy Cross Lutheran Church (LCMS) in Collinsville.

== See also ==
- Open Fuel Standard Act of 2011
- Lautenberg Chemical Safety Act of 2016

U.S. House of Representatives
Preceded by Dick Durbin	Member of the U.S. House of Representatives from Illinois's 20th congressional district 1997–2003	Constituency abolished
Preceded by David D. Phelps	Member of the U.S. House of Representatives from Illinois's 19th congressional district 2003–2013	Constituency abolished
Preceded by Tim Johnson	Member of the U.S. House of Representatives from Illinois's 15th congressional district 2013–2021	Succeeded by Mary Miller
U.S. order of precedence (ceremonial)
Preceded by Jerry Costello as Former U.S. Representative	Order of precedence of the United States as Former U.S. Representative	Succeeded by William Vollie Alexander Jr. as Former U.S. Representative
