= Open Fuel Standard Coalition =

U.S. political group

The Open Fuel Standard Coalition is a bipartisan group in the United States actively working for passage of H.R. 1687, the "Open Fuel Standard Act of 2011". The OFS Coalition views this legislation as the solution to an energy crisis by the implementing of alternative energy sources into the local fuel transportation market sector, with the goal of breaking the United States dependence on foreign oil. Specifically, the implementation of H.R. 1687, the Open Fuel Standard Act of 2011 would require vehicles sold in the US will have to either operate on mixed fuels, containing 85 percent ethanol, methanol, biodiesel, or any other alternative energy source.

== Purpose ==
The open fuel standard aims to create incentives to promote and invest in the emerging market of ethanol, methanol, biodiesel, and any other alternative fuel. Comparatively, mixed fuels produce less carbon emissions. The technology and resources are already available for flex-fuel cars, but the availability and access to pumps is scarce. China and Brazil have already implemented regulations on auto industries selling cars in their countries resulting in new manufacturing plants in both China and Brazil.

== Goal ==
The official goal of the OFS coalition is to pass H.R. 1687, the "Open Fuel Standard Act of 2011" in the 112th United States Congress and generate pressures on the administration, the United States Congress, and federal departments to take further action.
