= Open Fuel Standard Act of 2011 =

Open Fuel Standard Act of 2011 (H.R. 1687) was a bill in the United States House of Representatives that would have required that a certain portion of light-passenger vehicles sold in the U.S. be alternative fueling vehicles capable of running on something other than just gasoline. The Open Fuel Standard Act does not dictate what types of vehicles are to be sold, only that an increasing percentage of the passenger car fleet sold in the U.S. be capable of running on non-petroleum sources - whether it be natural gas, electric, alcohol fuels, hydrogen or biodiesel, with a catch-all provision for any other sustainable technologies. The bill was intended by its sponsors to ensure that new vehicles enable fuel competition so as to reduce the strategic importance of oil to the United States.

== Sponsors ==
Rep John Shimkus [R-IL19] introduced the bill along with Rep Eliot Engel [NY-17]

=== Cosponsors ===
Rep Bartlett, Roscoe G. [MD-6]

Rep Berman, Howard L. [CA-28]

Rep Blumenauer, Earl [OR-3]

Rep Boswell, Leonard L. [IA-3]

Rep Braley, Bruce L. [IA-1]

Rep Andre Carson [IN-7]

Rep Cole, Tom [OK-4]

Rep Dold, Robert J. [IL-10]

Rep Engel, Eliot [NY-17]

Rep Israel, Steve [NY-2]

Rep Henry C. "Hank," Jr. [GA-4]

Rep Loebsack, Dave [IA-2]

Rep McDermott, Jim [WA-7]

Rep Peterson, Collin C. [MN-7]

Rep Ross, Dennis [FL-12]

Rep Schwartz, Allyson Y. [PA-13]

== Supporting organizations ==
The Open Fuel Standards Coalition

Renewable Fuels Association

Set America Free

Methanol Institute

American Coalition for Ethanol
