= Kashinhou =

Kashinhou (化審法), short for 化学物質の審査及び製造等の規制に関する法律 (Kagaku Busshitsu no Shinsa Oyobi Seizoutou no Kisei ni Kansuru Houritsu), ("Law Concerning the Examination and Regulation of Manufacture, etc. of Chemical Substances") (Showa Act No. 117, 昭和48年法律第117号) is the current Chemicals and dangerous substances regulation law in Japan. The more concise abbreviated name is 化学物質審査規制法 (Kagaku Busshitsu Shinsa Kiseihou), or "Chemical Substances Control Law". This law featured the world's first new chemical pre-examination system.

== Coverage ==
This law was established to provide a framework to examine the import, manufacture, and use of industrial chemicals and refractory organic substances for persistence and health consequences, as well as the necessary legal restrictions in order to achieve those aims.

== History ==
The law has its origins in 1968, with an illness related to polychlorinated biphenyls poisoning in the Kanemi Oil Incident. In 1973, this law was established, radically overturning a prevailing attitude that long term contaminants bioaccumulating in humans was not problematic. Refractory organic substances, highly enriched uranium, and substances that possess long term toxicity to humans were classified as Section 1 Chemical Substances. Section 1 items were banned from manufacture or importation.

In 1986, a Section 2 Chemical Substances was added, which included trichloroethylene and tetrachloroethylene, which had contaminated groundwater. Questionable chemical substances that did not fall into above categories were introduced into a Section 2 Questionable Chemical substances category.

In 1999, the government ministries were reorganized, and the Ministry of the Environment was added as an overseer to the precursor ministries of the current Ministry of Health, Labour and Welfare, Ministry of Economy, Trade and Industry.

In 2003, under pressure from the Organisation for Economic Co-operation and Development, a third Section was created to surveillance of chemical substances harmful to flora and fauna but not to humans.

Regulation, policing, and surveillance of other laws, namely the Poisonous and Deleterious Substance Control Law, Stimulant Control Law, and Narcotics and Psychotropics Control Law were transferred to the current ministries as mentioned above.

== Example of Chemical inventories in various countries/regions ==
- Verordnung (EG) Nr. 1907/2006 (REACH)
- AICS - Australian Inventory of Chemical Substances
- DSL - Canadian Domestic Substances List
- NDSL - Canadian Non-Domestic Substances List
- KECL (Korean ECL) - Korean Existing Chemicals List
- ENCS (MITI) - Japanese Existing and New Chemical Substances
- PICCS - Philippine Inventory of Chemicals and Chemical Substances
- TSCA - US Toxic Substances Control Act
- SWISS - Giftliste 1
- SWISS - Inventory of Notified New Substances

== See also ==
- Toxic Substances Control Act of 1976
- EU REACH regulation
