= Frank R. Lautenberg Chemical Safety for the 21st Century Act =

American law regulating chemicals

- Other short titles: TSCA Modernization Act of 2015; Rural Healthcare Connectivity Act of 2016
- Long title: An Act to modernize the Toxic Substances Control Act, and for other purposes.
- Nicknames: Chemical Safety Improvement Act of 2016
- Enacted by: the 114th United States Congress
- Effective: December 18, 2016

Citations
- Public law: 114-182
- Statutes at Large: 130 Stat. 448

Legislative history
- Introduced in the House as H.R. 2576 by John Shimkus (R–IL–15) on May 26, 2015; Committee consideration by House Energy and Commerce Committee; Passed the House on June 23, 2015 (398-1 Roll call vote 378, via Clerk.House.gov); Passed the Senate on December 17, 2015 (Passed voice vote) with amendment; House agreed to Senate amendment on May 24, 2016 (403-12 Roll call vote 238, via Clerk.House.gov) with further amendment; Senate agreed to House amendment on June 7, 2016 (Agreed voice vote); Signed into law by President Barack Obama on June 22, 2016

The Frank R. Lautenberg Chemical Safety for the 21st Century Act is a law passed by the 114th United States Congress and signed into law by US President Barack Obama in 2016. Administered by the United States Environmental Protection Agency, which regulates the introduction of new or already existing chemicals, the Act amends and updates the Toxic Substances Control Act (TSCA) that went into force in 1976.

== History ==
Senators David Vitter and Frank Lautenberg introduced a TSCA reform bill as S. 1009 on May 22, 2013, co-sponsored by a number of other senators at the United States Senate Committee on Environment and Public Works. After Senator Lautenberg died, Senator Tom Udall sponsored Senate bill 697 in 2015, to amend and re-authorize TSCA, called the Frank R. Lautenberg Chemical Safety for the 21st Century Act. The House then passed H.R.2576, the TSCA Modernization Act of 2015, and was referred to the Senate.

Congress passed a reconciled version of the reform bill with bipartisan support in June 2016. On Wednesday, June 22, 2016, President Barack Obama signed the bill into law. Lawmakers and industry groups were largely supportive of the new law, while environmental advocates offered more mixed reactions.

== Changes to TSCA ==
TSCA as reformed by the Frank R. Lautenberg Chemical Safety for the 21st Century Act	TSCA pre-reform
Mandatory duty on EPA to evaluate existing chemicals with clear and enforceable deadlines	No duty to review, no deadlines for action
Chemicals assessed against a risk-based safety standard	Risk-benefit balancing standard
Unreasonable risks identified in the risk evaluation must be eliminated	Significant risks might not be addressed due to cost/benefit balancing and no mandate to act
Expanded authority to more quickly require development of chemical information when needed	Testing on existing chemicals required lengthy rulemaking
