= Toxic Substances Control Act of 1976 =

United States federal law

Toxic Substances Control Act
- Long title: An Act to regulate commerce and protect human health and the environment by requiring testing and necessary use restrictions on certain chemical substances, and for other purposes.
- Acronyms (colloquial): TSCA
- Enacted by: the 94th United States Congress
- Effective: October 11, 1976

Citations
- Public law: 94-469
- Statutes at Large: 90 Stat. 2003

Codification
- Titles amended: 15 U.S.C.: Commerce and Trade
- U.S.C. sections created: 15 U.S.C. ch. 53, subch. I §§ 2601–2629

Legislative history
- Introduced in the Senate as S. 3149 by John V. Tunney (D–CA) on March 16, 1976; Committee consideration by Senate Commerce, House Commerce; Passed the Senate on March 26, 1976 (60-13); Passed the House of Representatives on August 23, 1976 (319-45, in lieu of H.R. 14032); Reported by the joint conference committee on August 23, 1976; agreed to by the House of Representatives on September 28, 1976 (360-35) and by the Senate on September 28, 1976 (73-6); Signed into law by President Gerald Ford on October 11, 1976

Major amendments
- P.L. 99-519 (1986); P.L. 100-551 (1988); P.L. 101-637 (1990); P.L. 102-550 (1992); No Child Left Behind Act of 2002; Frank R. Lautenberg Chemical Safety for the 21st Century Act, Pub. L. 114–182 (text) (PDF) (2016)

The Toxic Substances Control Act (TSCA) is a United States law, passed by the Congress in 1976 and administered by the United States Environmental Protection Agency (EPA), that regulates chemicals not regulated by other U.S. federal statutes, including chemicals already in commerce and the introduction of new chemicals. When the TSCA was put into place, industry had an opportunity to submit chemicals that were existing in commerce at that time. Such chemicals became the original TSCA Inventory, allowing each to remain commerce without EPA review. Its three main objectives are to assess and regulate new commercial chemicals before they enter the market, to regulate chemicals already existing in 1976 that posed an "unreasonable risk of injury to health or the environment", as for example PCBs, lead, mercury and radon, and to regulate these chemicals' distribution and use.

Contrary to what the name implies, TSCA does not separate chemicals into categories of toxic and non-toxic. Rather it prohibits the manufacture or importation of chemicals that are not listed on the TSCA Inventory or subject to one of many exemptions. Chemicals listed on the inventory are referred to as "existing chemicals", while chemicals not listed are referred to as new chemicals. The act defines the term "chemical substance" as "any organic or inorganic substance of a particular molecular identity, including any combination of these substances occurring in whole or in part as a result of a chemical reaction or occurring in nature, and any element or uncombined radical" although TSCA excludes chemicals regulated by other federal statutes from the definition of a chemical substance.

Generally, manufacturers must submit premanufacturing notification to EPA prior to manufacturing or importing new chemicals for commerce. Exceptions include foods, food additives, drugs, cosmetics or devices regulated under the Federal Food, Drug, and Cosmetic Act, pesticides regulated by the Federal Insecticide, Fungicide, and Rodenticide Act, tobacco and tobacco products regulated by the Bureau of Alcohol, Tobacco, Firearms and Explosives, substances used only in small quantities for research and development under Section 5(h)(3), and radioactive materials and wastes regulated by the Nuclear Regulatory Commission. EPA reviews new chemical notifications and if it finds an "unreasonable risk of injury to health or the environment", it may regulate the substance from limiting uses or production volume to outright banning it. In 2016, the Frank R. Lautenberg Chemical Safety for the 21st Century Act was the first major overhaul in many years.

== Overview ==
The Toxic Substances Control Act of 1976 mandated EPA to protect the public from "unreasonable risk of injury to health or the environment" by regulating the manufacture (including import), processing, distribution, use, sale, and disposal of chemicals. This act does not address pollution, which is regulated through the Clean Air Act, Clean Water Act and the Resource Conservation and Recovery Act. Instead, like FIFRA (the Federal Insecticide, Fungicide, and Rodenticide Act), TSCA regulates commercial products. The act gave EPA the authority to gather information on and require manufacturers (and importers) to test products, required EPA to create a listing of existing chemicals and the industry to notify EPA of new chemicals being produced, and gave EPA the ability to regulate chemical production and use. For example, in 2019 EPA banned the use of methylene chloride in consumer paint and coating removal products.

The types of chemicals regulated by the act fall into two broad categories: existing and new. The distinction is made because the act regulates the two categories of chemicals in different ways. Existing chemicals include any chemical currently listed on the TSCA Inventory under TSCA section 8(b). "[A]ny chemical that is not [listed] on the [TSCA] Inventory is considered a 'new chemical substance.'" The Inventory includes all chemical substances manufactured or imported into the United States for a non-exempt purpose.

=== Sections ===
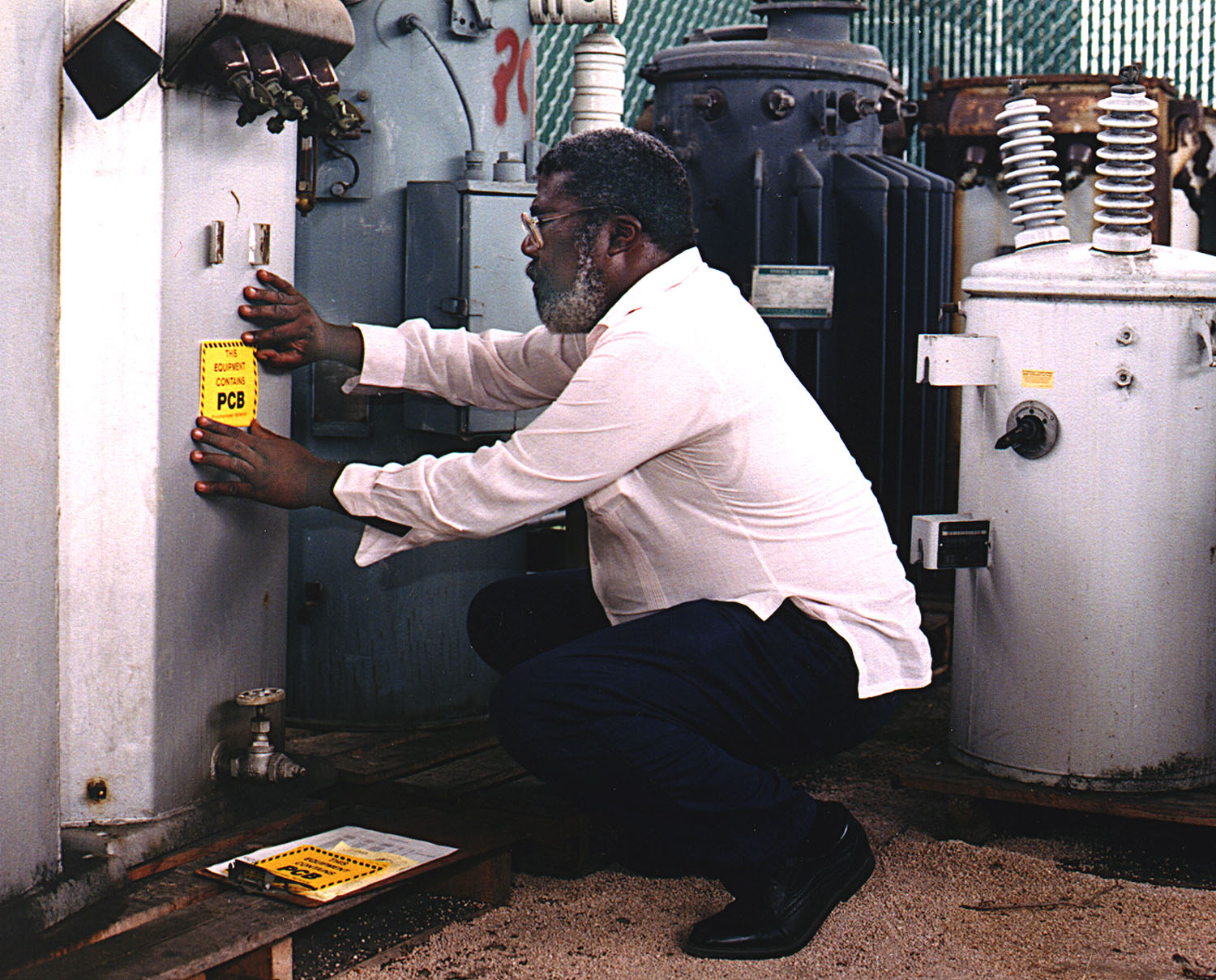
Labeling PCB-containing transformers

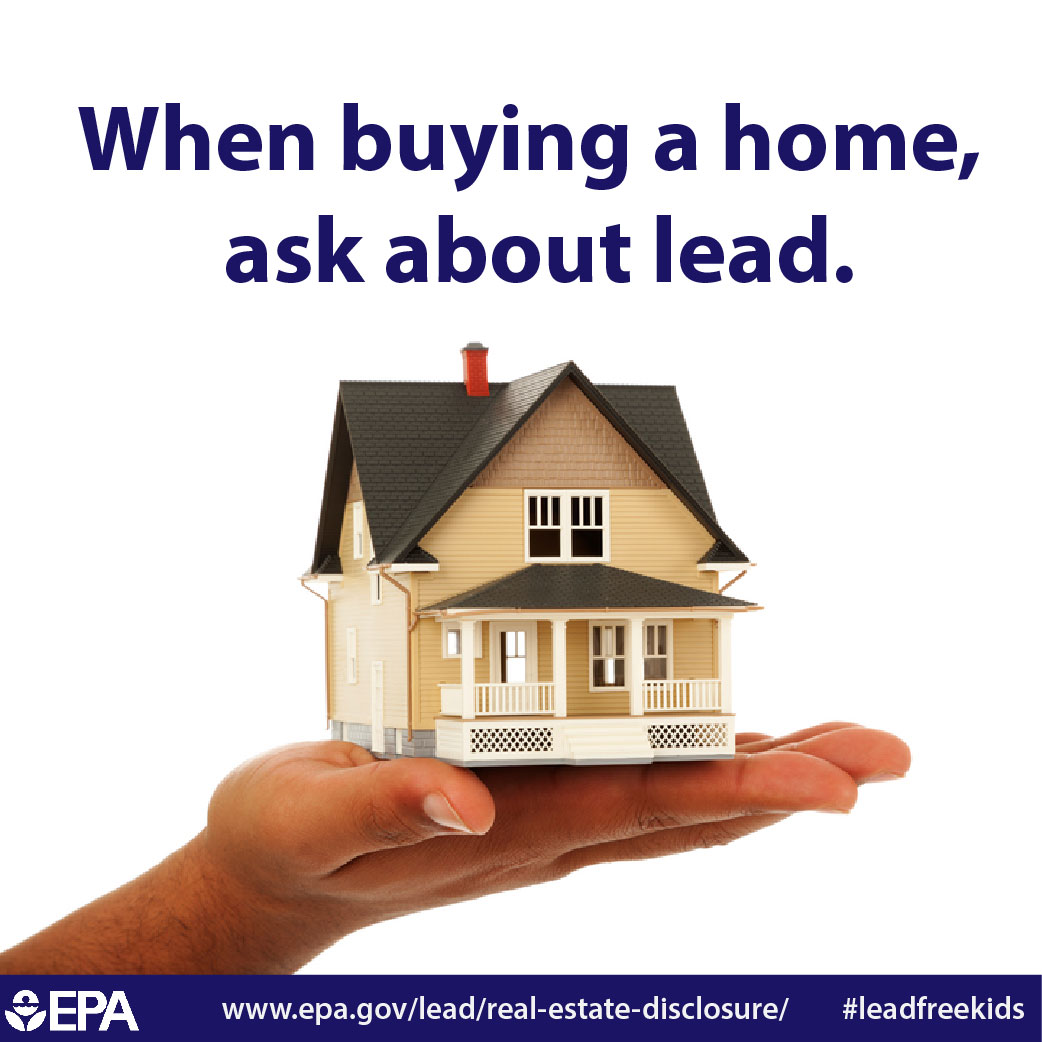
EPA flyer on lead-based paint disclosure

The TSCA is found in United States law at Title 15 of the United States Code, Chapter 53, and administered by EPA.

- Title I of the TSCA, "Control of Toxic Substances", is the original substance of the 1976 act, establishes the core programs, including regulation of new and existing chemicals, testing, and reporting.

Key sections include:

- Section 3 - Definitions
- Section 4 - Testing
- Section 5 - New Chemicals
- Section 6 - Existing Chemicals
- Section 7 - Imminent Hazards
- Section 8 - Recordkeeping and Reporting
- Section 11 - Inspections
- Section 12 - Exports
- Section 13 - Imports
- Section 14 - Confidential Business Information
- Section 15 - Prohibited Acts
- Section 18 - Preemption
- Section 20 - Citizen Suits
- Section 21 - Citizen Petitions
- Section 26 - Administration of TSCA
- Title II, "Asbestos Hazard Emergency Response", authorizes EPA to set standards for asbestos abatement in schools, and requires asbestos contractors to be trained and certified, enacted in 1986 under PL 99-519 and amended in 1990 under PL 101-637.
- Title III, "Indoor Radon Abatement", requires EPA to publish a guide about radon health risks and to perform studies of radon levels in schools and federal buildings, enacted in 1988 under PL 100-551.
- Title IV, "Lead Exposure Reduction" requires EPA to identify sources of lead contamination in the environment to regulate amounts of lead allowed in products, including paint and toys, and to establish state programs that monitor and reduce lead exposures, enacted in 1992 under PL 102-550.

U.S. regulations implementing the TSCA are in 40 CFR Part 195 for radon, and in 40 CFR Parts 700 through 799 for other matters.

Under 15 USC 2605(e) the TSCA specifically regulates PCBs. Subsection (2)(A) provides that after January 1, 1978, "no person may manufacture, process or distribute in commerce or use any PCB in any manner other than in a totally enclosed manner." It also authorizes EPA to regulate PCBs disposal.

Acting under the TSCA and other laws, EPA has set limits for PCB contamination of the environment. It has engaged in protracted negotiations with the U.S. General Electric company and other firms for remediation of sites contaminated with PCBs such as the upper Hudson River.

== History ==
The TSCA was passed by the Congress and signed into law by President Gerald Ford on October 11, 1976 after years of negotiation between the government and chemical producers. A bill was first introduced in Congress in 1971, but it was opposed by industry and environmental groups, leading to a five-year stalemate. TSCA authorized the EPA to regulate new and existing chemicals. TSCA was in response to Congress' growing concerns about the unreasonable risks that chemicals pose to human health and the environment. TSCA limits the manufacture, processing, commercial distribution, use, and disposal of chemical substances including PCBs, asbestos, radon and lead-based paint.

=== The 1971 Council on Environmental Quality Report ===
In a 1971 report, the Council on Environmental Quality (CEQ) urged the Federal government to regulate toxic substances in the U.S. CEQ explained that existing regulations were insufficient to protect human health and the environment. For example, the existing law only took effect after the damages were done and did nothing to prevent future damage. As John R. Quarles Jr., the EPA Deputy Administrator, later explained during congressional testimony in 1975, "While some authority exists to control the production of certain categories of toxic substances, such as pesticides, drugs, and food additives, most existing Federal authorities are designed to prevent harmful exposure only after the substances have been introduced into production." In order to adequately regulate what chemicals should enter the environment, CEQ recommended that the government create a more comprehensive chemical policy to identify and control the chemicals that are manufactured, produced, and used in the U.S economy. Specifically, CEQ recommended that TSCA strengthen government oversight by requiring the following measures: First, manufacturers should notify officials when they use or produce new chemicals, or plan to sell a significant volume of old chemicals. Second, producers should test their chemicals and report data to officials on the quantities, uses, physical and biological properties, and any other information is necessary for assessing hazardous materials. Lastly, with this information, the government should disclose any information about the health effects caused by dangerous chemicals to the public.

=== Congress' response to CEQ and the drafting of TSCA ===
Congress agreed with CEQ that additional authority was required to test chemicals to determine their effect, and responded to CEQ's recommendation by proposing many House and Senate bills between 1972 and 1973. Policy makers were also aware that the cancer mortality rate had increased and recognized that the cause of the increase was related to the rise of industrial chemicals in consumer products and the environment. As a result of these concerns, Congress concluded the risk of chemical exposure to the public were serious enough to warrant swift legislative action.

Three key assumptions informed Congress' approach to drafting a chemicals control policy. First, in order to limit the risks that chemicals pose to human health and the environment, it would be important to be proactive in understanding toxic substances and use preventive measures. Second, toxic risk should be approached in a "holistic rather than fragmented" manner. Third, it was important to collect as much information as possible about the toxicity of chemicals and the risks associated with them.

Although there was much support for policy to address public health risks from chemical exposure, the law was stalled at the last minute because of disagreement over the proper scope of chemical screening prior to commercial production. However, a series of environmental disasters, such as the Kepone catastrophe at Hopewell, Virginia, and the pollution of the Hudson River "and other waterways by PCBs, the threat of stratospheric ozone depletion from chlorofluorocarbon (CFC) emissions, and contamination of agricultural products by polybrominated biphenyls (PBBs) in the State of Michigan" provided a clearer picture of the costs of weak regulation over toxic substances. Subsequently, the legislation passed in 1976.

Congress designed TSCA to empower EPA to collect more information on chemicals and their potential dangerous effect on human health and the environment. As a result, TSCA's jurisdictional scope is extremely broad. Congress's definition of chemical substances includes "any organic or inorganic substance of a particular molecular identity", and "any combination of such substances occurring in whole or in part as a result of a chemical reaction or occurring in nature" as well as "any element or uncombined radical". These chemicals are found in children's products (e.g., toys) cleaning products, furniture, electronics, building materials, and car interiors. The law attempts to oversee the manufacture (including import), processing, distribution, use and or disposal of such chemical substances. Prior to the enactment of the Frank R. Lautenberg Chemical Safety for the 21st Century Act, TSCA directed the EPA to use the least burdensome method to reduce chemical risk to reasonable levels while taking into consideration the benefits provided by the chemical product or process.

=== Implementation ===
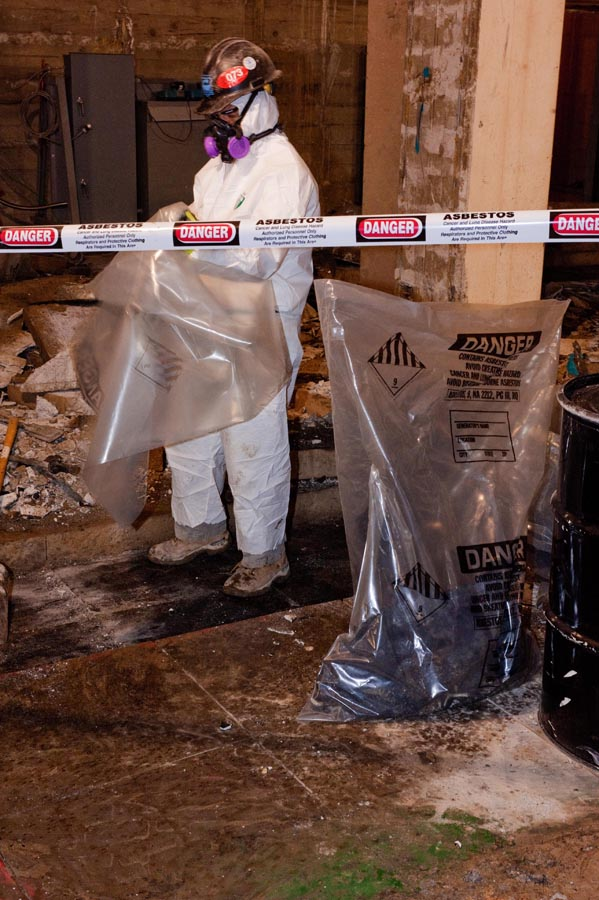
Asbestos abatement

There have been many challenges in the implementation of TSCA. First, according to David Markell, Professor of Law at Florida State University, TSCA and preexisting regulations have "an after-the-fact focus" that fails to protect individuals before toxic substances are released in products and is media focused without addressing how to control pollution within communities.

Second, TSCA implementation is difficult because of the number of chemicals in the US market and high costs associated with fully assessing the toxic impacts of so many chemicals on human health and the environment. 62,000 chemicals on the market at the time were listed on the original TSCA Inventory of Chemical Substances. TSCA "grandfathered" these 62,000 chemicals, allowing these substances to remain on the market without first assessing toxic impacts. New chemicals, however, would be subject to review for health and environmental risks. Since then number of chemicals listed on the TSCA Inventory has grown to roughly 84,000. The EPA has only required approximately 200 of these 84,000 chemicals to be tested, and of the 22,000 chemicals introduced since 1976, chemical manufacturers have produced very little data for the EPA on potential health and/or environmental impacts.

Third, even though, prior to 2016, TSCA gave authority to the EPA to require testing chemicals through rule making process, EPA had difficulty obtaining the data needed to determine their risks. It was difficult to collect information from industries about the risks of chemicals and EPA has concluded that conducting its own testing is too costly. EPA is authorized to require industry to perform testing of chemicals being produced in substantial quantities or if EPA finds that the manufacturing, production or use of a chemical "may present an unreasonable risk of injury to health or the environment."

The only information required from chemical producers is chemical identities, names, and molecular structures, categories of use, amount manufactured and processed for each category of use, descriptions of byproducts resulting from manufacture, processing, use, and disposal, environmental and health effects, number of individuals exposed, number of employees exposed and the duration of exposure, and manner or method of chemical disposal.

In order to obtain more information related to chemical risks, the EPA may require manufacturers to conduct testing. This occurs either by (1) mutual agreement, (2) voluntary industry efforts, such as those under the HPV Challenge Program, (3) by rule, or (4) by order. The EPA has also created the Sustainable Futures (SF) Initiative model, which allows companies to voluntarily screen their products that might pose risks to human health or the environment. Through this initiative, the EPA hopes to enable manufacturers to better predict hazards and exposures of their products. The program is designed to enable companies to bring safer chemicals to the market.

== Regulation of existing chemicals ==
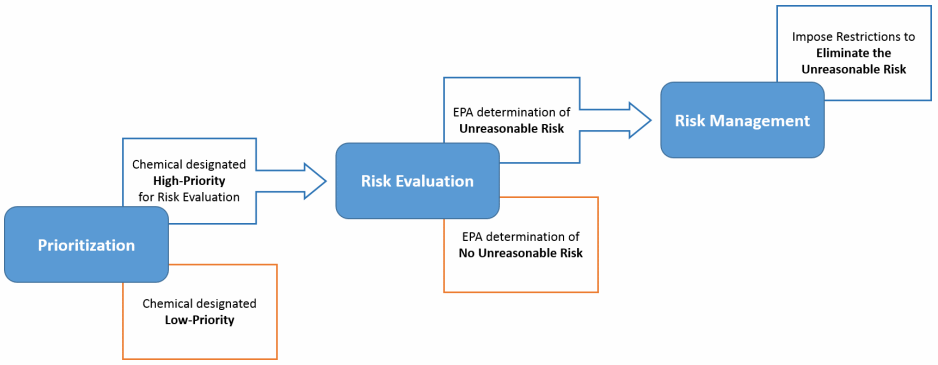
Existing Chemicals Review process

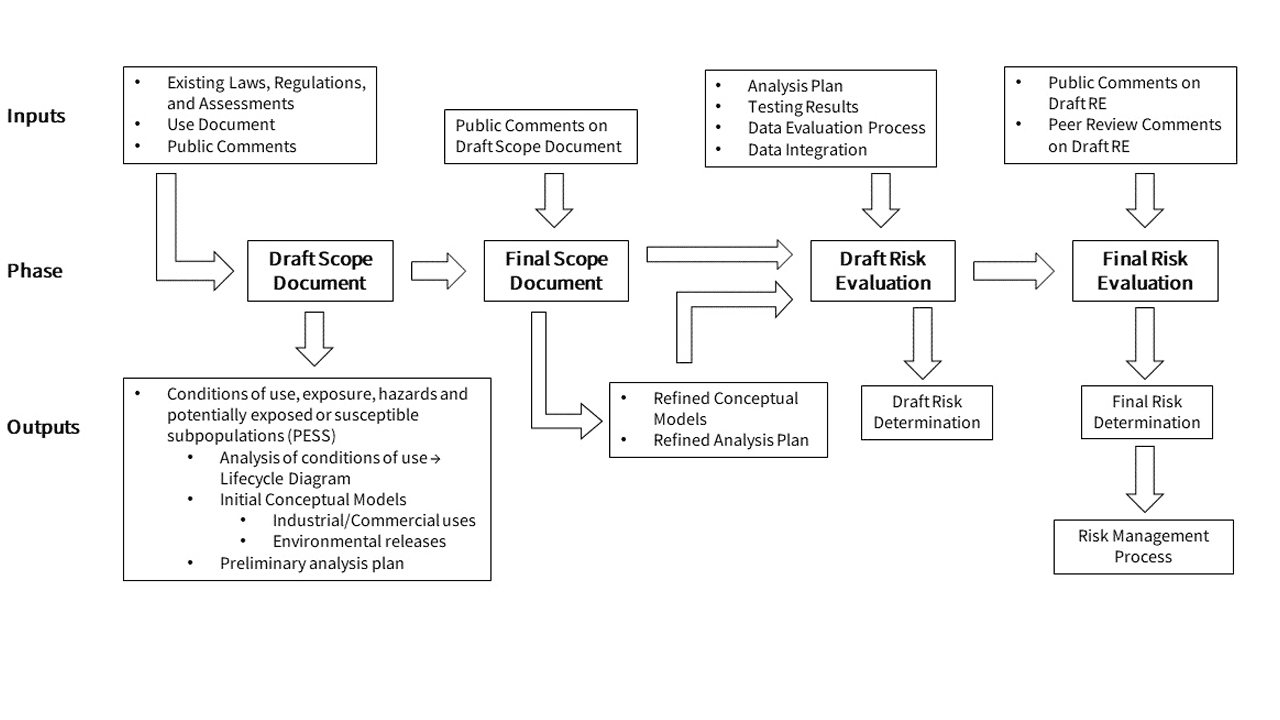
Risk evaluation process for existing chemicals

Existing chemicals are those listed in the TSCA Inventory. The substances that were placed on the original Inventory (because they were in commerce when TSCA was enacted) were not assessed prior to such listing. Rather, TSCA gave EPA authority to assess risk of those existing chemicals, but did not require that EPA do so. With the passage of the Frank R. Lautenberg Chemical Safety for the 21st Century Act, EPA is now required to evaluate all existing chemicals. Without testing, TSCA grandfathered the use of these chemicals into TSCA's list of "existing" (as opposed to "new") chemicals. For existing chemicals, manufacturers need to generate and report data on risk, manufacturing and processing, adverse health effects, published and unpublished health and safety studies, and "substantial risks". to the EPA Also, if a substance is subject of a Significant New Use Rule (SNUR), a company would have to submit and receive approval of a Significant New Use Notice (SNUN) prior to undertaking the significant new use(s) defined in the SNUR.

In 1989, the EPA issued a final rule under section 6 to ban the manufacturing, importing, and processing of nearly all asbestos-containing products in the USA. However, it had only limited success in using the authority granted under TSCA section 6 to control chemicals tested and deemed dangerous to public health. The EPA's failure to adequately regulate these chemicals caused strong debates over the legal burden the EPA bears in banning chemicals. The EPA has been successful in restricting five chemicals using section 6 authority (PCBs, chlorofluorocarbons, dioxin, asbestos, and hexavalent chromium) in its 38-year history, with the ban on asbestos being partially overturned in 1991. EPA has restricting some existing chemicals using Section 5 SNURs.

As of 2015, 250 of the more than 60,000 existing chemicals have been subject to required tested by the EPA. 140 of those chemicals were tested by regulatory order and 60 were tested after voluntary consent by the manufacturer. Additionally, there are 3,000 high production volume (HPV) chemicals, produced or imported in quantities exceeding one million pounds per year. These HPV chemicals only constitute one third of existing chemicals, but their high volumes raise concern about the lack of basic hazard information. Many environmental groups, such as Natural Resources Defense Council, complained that, prior to TSCA reform in 2016, the EPA was nearly powerless to take regulatory action against dangerous chemicals, even those known to cause cancer or other serious health effects. The HPV program lead to the generation of new or release of existing data on over 2,200 chemicals.

== Regulation of new chemicals ==
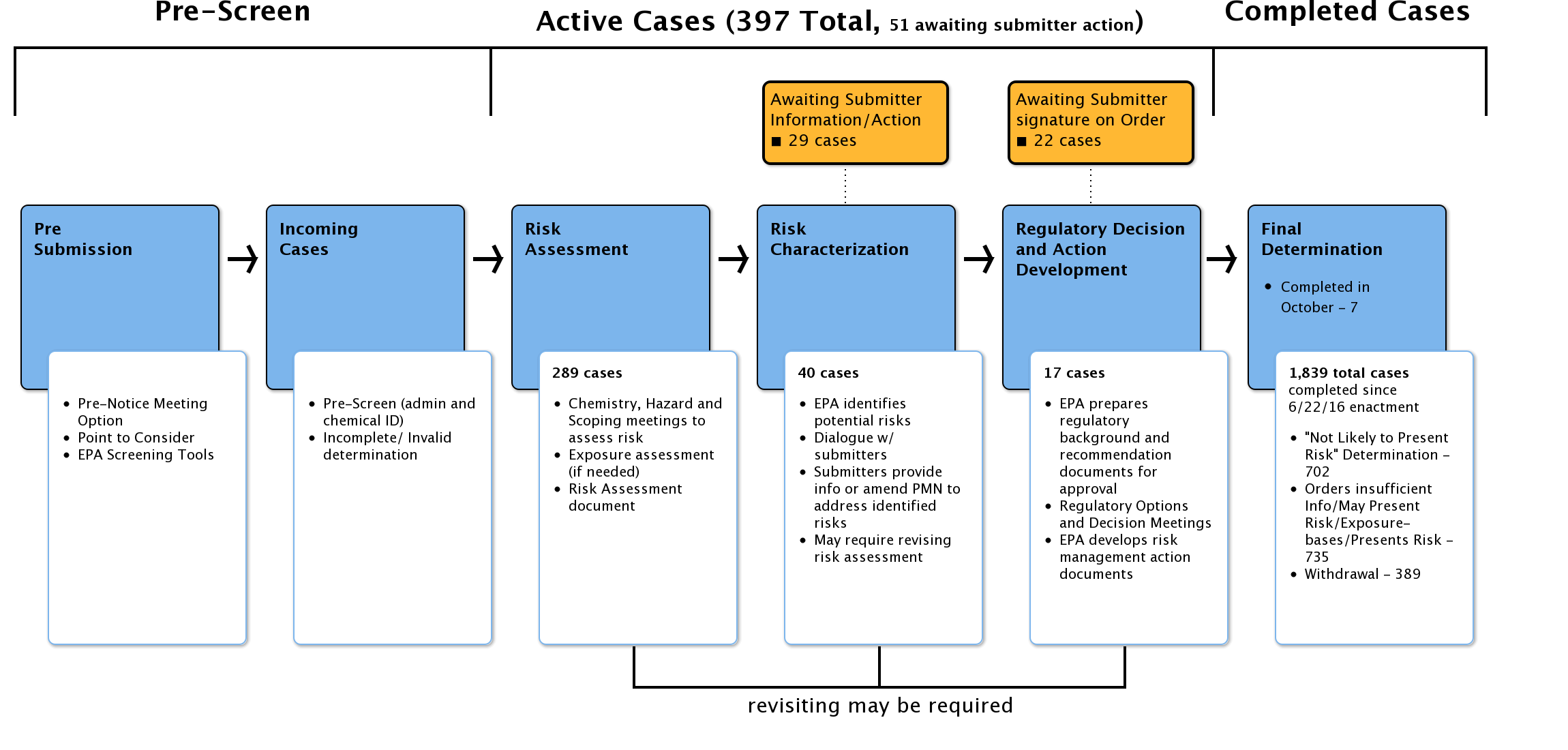
Status chart of new chemicals being reviewed by EPA, November 1, 2022

Companies must notify the EPA of their intention to manufacture (or import) a new chemical (one not listed on the TSCA Inventory) by submitting a PMN at least 90 days prior to the first manufacture or import for a non-exempt purpose. Section 5 of TSCA does not require any toxicity testing before submitting a PMN. Submitters need not generate new data, but any data on the substance, including physicochemical data, toxicity data, fate data, and exposure data that are "in the submitter's possession or control" must be included in a notice. If data on the substance are not available, EPA relies on data on analogs or models to evaluate whether the substance "may present an unreasonable risk." In order to regulate new chemicals, the EPA must determine that the chemical "...may present an unreasonable risk of injury to health or the environment..." or show that the chemical "... is or will be produced in substantial quantities, and such substance either enters or may reasonably be anticipated to enter the environment in substantial quantities or there is or may be significant or substantial human exposure to the substance...."

If the EPA does not satisfy these requirements, it cannot act to block the manufacture of the new chemical. The EPA has only 90 days from receipt of a PMN to act before the new chemical may be legally marketed and included in products. In consequence, only 40 percent of acute toxicity and mutagenicity testing is ever completed, even less data on long-term effects or specific endpoints (including subchronic, neurotoxicological, developmental, reproductive, and chronic) is ever generated. Additionally, less than 5 percent of data on toxicity to aquatic organisms is submitted with a PMN. " From 1979 to 1994 the EPA OPPT's new chemical program received over 24000 PMNs and sought to delay manufacture and require additional data for only 5000 of those submissions. Half of these nonetheless ultimately entered and are still on the market.

EPA evaluation found that 85 percent of PMN data on health effects is deficient, and 67 percent of PMNs contain deficiencies on health or environmental effects of any kind. In order to compensate for this deficiency of data, Section 5 of TSCA created The Structure Activity Team (SAT) along with structural-activity relations (SARs) to review PMN chemicals. SAT consists of a team of expert scientists and specialists who evaluate the potential environmental fate, and health and environmental hazards of new chemicals

When there is a data gap for a PMN substance, hazard assessments for chemicals depend heavily on models, SARs based on analogous chemicals, or, in some cases, data on the subject chemical retrieved from public databases or reference material such as Beilstein. However, it has been argued that SARs and SAT's review process do not adequately evaluate risks associated with new chemicals. For instance, there is no minimum data set beyond information already in possession at the time the PMN is submitted. The EPA may regulate chemicals that enter the market only under the standards of TSCA and also carries the burden of proving the safety of existing chemicals

== Chemical Substance Inventory (TSCA Inventory) ==
The TSCA Chemical Substance Inventory (TSCA Inventory) is EPA's comprehensive list of confidential and non-confidential chemical substances. The non-confidential inventory, which includes the specific identity of non-confidential substances and a generic identity for confidential substances, is provided in Microsoft Access and CSV formats within ZIP files.

It is critical to understand TSCA nomenclature rules to determine if a particular chemical product is listed on the Inventory.

Inventory notification reporting is through an updated user interface in the Central Data Exchange (CDX) Chemical Safety and Pesticide Programs (CSPP) web application for company-authorized officials and their support; there is no role for the public to access the CDX CSPP web app. Data submitted to EPA under the quadriennial Chemical Data Reporting Rule is published by EPA on its ChemView website and as a downloadable database.

The Toxics Release Inventory (TRI) is a different inventory for Superfund reporting.

== Testing ==
Prior to 2016, EPA had the authority to require manufacturers to test existing chemicals under Section 4, but in each case the EPA had to undertake formal notice-and-comment rule-making which is subject to judicial review under the "substantial evidence" standard. In particular, the requirement that the EPA determine that the chemical "may present an unreasonable risk" creates a regulatory "Catch-22" as such a determination requires much of the very data that the EPA cannot access or cause to be generated without first making the determination. This burden was one of the drivers for changes to Section 4 during the negotiations to reform TSCA.

Using its new authority, EPA has issued several test orders, including some undergoing risk evaluation under Section 6 and some per- and polyfluoroalkyl substances.

== Criticism ==
TSCA had been severely criticized by non-governmental organizations, academics, scientists, and even government agencies for failing to regulate the safe use of chemicals affecting human health and environmental welfare effectively. Prior to the TSCA amendments in 2016, "the act has not been substantially updated." Organizations concerned about product safety, "including the chemical industry, environmental and public health advocates, and the EPA" have attempted to mitigate the effects of weak regulation. They argue that "the inability to function as intended results from a series of legal, organizational, and political challenges." According to Wilson and Schwarzman, there are three gaps in US chemicals policy:

- "Data gap: Producers are not required to investigate and disclose sufficient information on the hazard traits of chemicals to government, the public, or businesses that use chemicals.
- "Safety gap: Government lacks the legal tools it needs to efficiently identify, prioritize, and take action to mitigate the potential health and environmental effects of hazardous chemicals.
- "Technology gap: Industry and government have invested only marginally in green chemistry research, development, and education."

The EPA Office of the Inspector General said in 2010 that implementation has been "inconsistent and presents a minimal presence." The report criticized the process by which the EPA handles new TSCA cases, claiming it is "predisposed to protect industry information rather than to provide public access to health and safety studies." GAO suggests that concern for trade secrets is preventing effective testing. In come cases, toxicity studies do not include the specific identity of the test substance and cannot report any problems because "health and safety data are of limited value if the chemical the data pertain to is unknown."

=== State regulation of toxic substances and chemicals ===
Certain state governments have implemented "comprehensive regulatory programs" for stricter control on toxic chemicals as a response to the failure of Congress to modernize TSCA. Some critics of TSCA note its inability to support meaningful action to prevent a patchwork of state policies as state lawmakers in 18 states have collectively passed 71 chemical laws since 2003. In states such as California, Connecticut, and Michigan diverse chemical policy actions were introduced favoring tighter regulation to protect vulnerable populations and the environment from exposure to dangerous chemicals.

Critics favoring a federal reform of TSCA argue that the patchwork of state chemical management laws create "tensions between federal and state powers." Moreover, state law initiatives and rules to target chemicals have significant support from "the public demanding stricter chemical control." Stringent state laws have successfully implemented more regulation on "BPA in plastic products and food beverage containers or flame retardants in furniture." Campaigns focusing on increasing consumer awareness of chemicals in products have been able to educate the public about the potential risk of exposure to chemical products that can harm their health and the environment. According to a poll conducted by the Mellman Group, 78 percent of Americans are seriously concerned about the threat to children's health from toxic chemicals in day-to-day life. The same poll reported that 33 percent of the respondents answered that everyday exposure to toxic chemicals is a serious issue.

=== Chemical industry's support for TSCA reform ===
In 2009, chemical manufacturers stated that TSCA needs "modernizing" to offer better regulation of current and future chemical products available in the market. The chemical industry is frustrated with state-level restrictions because state policies on chemical products create "market disruption and impose unnecessary regulatory burdens, without necessarily improving public health." The chemical manufacturers "reluctantly" support a reform of TSCA, agreeing that it is necessary to avoid ambiguities. The chemical producers support implementation of more uniform and consistent regulations at the federal level that pre-empt state law. The modernization of TSCA can give the chemical industry a standard to follow and allow them to market their products for domestic consumption or international sales without having to spend more money trying to comply with a myriad of individual state regulations. Yet, environmental groups and state agencies argue that TSCA provisions "protect confidential business information" (CBI) preventing them from accessing information relevant to their task. However, chemical manufacturers and their trade associations would prefer a weaker version of TSCA that pre-empts state law, due to the more than 40 different state government regulations on toxic chemicals. In addition, businesses would like a standard that can be applied uniformly, rather than having to report many different and overlapping sets of requirements to the individual states where the companies do business. Chemical manufacturers have also automated quality processes by incorporating a quality management system in efforts to foster a better, safer industry.

=== Consumer support for the reform of TSCA ===
Growing public concern about exposure to dangerous chemicals in their everyday life has received attention from state and local agencies. Redefining is needed to respond to the consumer demand: "public policies governing chemical design, production, and use need deep restructuring in light of new science on the health and environmental effects of anthropogenic chemicals" For better management and control of chemicals "a string of high-profile campaigns focusing on chemicals in consumer products" has made consumers aware of "chemical exposures to everyday life" by releasing information on the hazards and outcome of chemical use. Labeling is an alternative solution to give the consumer the freedom to choose what products to buy "as a condition for entering or remaining on the market, using a standard that establishes a reasonable certainty of no harm." The private sector responded to the public concern of chemical exposure in everyday life by incorporating "screening mechanism(s) to diminish and/or prevent the marketing of products containing chemical substances that could potentially adversely affect human health and the environment." The demand for sustainable products can force the market to adopt more green chemistry.

=== Technological innovation and TSCA reform ===
Opponents to TSCA reform proposals argue that stringent legislation can be seen as "job-killing". Nevertheless, the demand for sustainable products can increase innovation and investment in new products that can eventually replace toxic chemicals. Green chemistry is an innovative way to design chemicals to be less hazardous, with the goal of making chemicals and products "benign by design". According to the Safer Chemicals, Healthy Families Coalition, "18 states have collectively passed 71 chemical laws since 2003." Similarly, the state of California implemented the California Green Chemistry Initiative (CGCI) in an effort to increase innovation and reduce or eliminate hazardous substances to human health and the environment. The CGCI responds to the demand by consumers and environmental groups advocating for greener products.

Other groups concerned with TSCA's lack of efficacy include the Physicians for Social Responsibility, the U.S. Public Interest Research Group, the Environmental Defense Fund, the Lung Cancer Alliance and the Asbestos Disease Awareness Organization, representing more than 11 million people nationwide. These diverse groups, under the umbrella of the Natural Resources Defense Council however, were displeased with the new draft bill written by deceased Senator Lautenberg in May 2013. The groups were calling for greater oversight and reporting of health hazards of chemicals contained in everyday products.

==== Nanotechnology ====
Green technology innovation introduced new products using nanotechnology available for consumption. The ultra-fine nanoparticles can enter the human body via the skin, lungs or intestinal tract and may induce undesirable genetic changes as a side effect. The regulation of nano particles is another challenge for TSCA, "there are no specific regulations on nanoparticles except existing regulations covering the same material in bulk form." However, if the bulk form of the nanomaterial is not listed on the TSCA Inventory, the nanomaterial is a new chemical substance that is subject to pre-market review.

There is not enough knowledge about the potential risk of exposure while new nano material created at a rapid rate is incorporated into consumer products without testing the toxicity risk of exposure to human health and the environment. Technological creation of new chemicals is ahead of TSCA regulation for new chemicals. The U.S. chemical industry claims having tight regulations can interfere with their ability to compete. Nevertheless, in Europe new regulation motivated the chemical industry to innovate. For instance, the European parliament implemented a successful comprehensive reform of REACH by applying the "No data, no market" rule to pressure chemical manufacturers to submit safety data for both new and existing chemicals produced in or exported to Europe. This approach motivated the chemical industry in Europe to innovate, invest more in research & development and produce greener products.

== TSCA and environmental justice ==
TSCA can promote environmental justice in communities where minorities and low-income residents disproportionately bear great exposure to toxic chemicals increasing their risk to suffer from "chronic diseases and conditions such as prostate cancer, learning disabilities, asthma, infertility, and obesity." Public policy can transform and empower communities "fighting environmental racism" associated with industrial facilities built near low-income neighborhoods. Communities from minority groups are disproportionately affected by "environmental threats from toxic contamination, locally unwanted land use (LULUs) to unsafe and substandard housing and natural-resource extractions" cannot wait for years until bureaucratic processes demonstrate their health has been at risk from living under these conditions.

Studies have shown that "lower-income people were found to be significantly more likely than were higher income people to live near a polluting industrial facility." The market dynamics responds to "the industry seeking to build their facilities where land is cheap and where industrial labor pools and sources of materials are nearby." Eventually, industrial facilities may contribute to the depreciation of property in the neighboring areas affecting the value of housing because of noise, release of pollutants, and fear of health impact. Wealthy communities will actively oppose the placing of industrial facilities near them but the low-income neighborhoods "and communities of color become an easier target" as they are not well represented or well organized to fight against the industry and the government. Environmental disparities is a prevalent issue for low-income people as they become trapped in "housing discrimination" living in polluted neighborhoods unable to relocate to a nicer area.

=== Populations vulnerable to toxic and chemical substances exposure ===
Environmental justice groups can engage the community to impact local state and federal policy. TSCA regulation can protect public health by "limiting the market for hazardous chemicals and promote safe chemical production." Vulnerable population such as infants, pregnant women, the elderly and certain occupational workers bear a higher risk to diseases from exposure to toxic chemicals. The elderly are vulnerable from exposure to chemicals that may impair their weak immune system, and cause heart disease among other health issues from interactions with medication. Children are vulnerable to the health impacts of environmental injustice because their immune system is immature and they cannot handle the amount of chemicals in relation to the size of their body. To protect vulnerable groups the federal, state and local government could implement better policy to protect them from the increasing number of chemical exposure happening in daily basis. This concern is reflected in the Frank R. Lautenberg Chemical Safety for the 21st Century Act, which includes a requirement that EPA evaluate risk to "potentially exposed and susceptible subpopulations".

==== Children's exposure to toxic chemicals ====
Children are more susceptible to develop patterns of illness with longtime effect in their health for which chemical exposure can be contributing pediatric disease. The main health problems associated with environmental chemical pollutants are asthma, lead poisoning and obesity. It is estimated that "the annual costs of environmentally attributable diseases in American children due to lead poisoning amounts to $43.4 billion." Toxic chemicals "threaten the health of the developing fetus, babies, young children and teens." It is important to protect children from chemical exposures as they "are less able than adults to break down and excrete toxic compounds."

Children are exposed to newly invented chemicals used for consumer products, and is also found in "air, food, water, homes, schools, and communities". Communities living near hot spots present health problems "associated with both social and environmental stressors", this can put a disproportionately burden on families. Therefore, "information on potential toxicity" can help parents to make better decisions about the products they purchase for the use of the children. Information about the toxicity is only available for about "two-thirds of the 3000 high production volume (HPV) chemicals". Policy and regulation to protect vulnerable groups can reduce the exposure of children to toxic substances. For instance, in 2008, the state of Maine implemented the Kid-Safe Act to protect children from exposure to lead in toys "and bisphenol A (better known as BPA) in baby bottles"

In January 2016, the Center for Science in the Public Interest released a report entitled Seeing Red - Time for Action on Food Dyes which criticized the continued use of artificial food coloring in the United States. The report estimated that over half a million children in the United States suffer adverse behavioral reactions as a result of ingesting food dyes, with an estimated cost exceeding $5 billion per year, citing data from by the Centers for Disease Control and Prevention. The report urges the Food and Drug Administration to take action to ban or curtail the use of such dyes. Readers are reminded that baby bottles and artificial food coloring are not regulated under TSCA jurisdiction, rather they are regulated under the Federal Food, Drug, and Cosmetic Act. However, other toxic substances that may be found in baby food (e.g., bisphenol A), are under TSCA jurisdiction.

==== Pregnant women's exposure to chemicals ====
Pregnant women exposure to toxic chemicals in daily basis "can impact the reproductive and developmental health" during critical windows of development, this may lead to a higher risk for birth defects and childhood illnesses and "disability across the entire span of human life". Health professionals can provide information to women planning to become pregnant or already pregnant to avoid potential hazards and exposure to environmental toxic chemicals. Eating healthy food can reduce the impact of toxic chemicals, for instance consuming organic food. Mothers who are breastfeeding can expose their child to toxic chemicals in their milk. When the diet of children is modified from "conventional to organic food, the levels of pesticides in their bodies decline", but low-income families have to prioritize their needs and buying organic food may not be possible because of a budget constraint Readers are reminded that pesticides are not regulated under TSCA jurisdiction, rather they are regulated under the Federal Insecticide, Fungicide, and Rodenticide Act. However, other toxic substances that can be transmitted through breast milk (e.g., per- and polyfluoroalkyl substances (PFAS)) are under TSCA jurisdiction.

==== Occupational workers' exposure to toxic chemicals ====
According to the Occupational Safety & Health Administration (OSHA) workers have the right to a safe workplace that do not pose a risk of serious harm. Occupational exposure to chemicals can happen through direct skin contact, inhalation, ingestion or eye contact. People working under certain occupations are more exposed to toxic chemicals that can have a negative longtime effect in their health. If the rate of exposure exceeds the capacity of the body to detoxify and eliminate them, it can accumulate in the body and potentially harm it. Male and female fertility can be compromised from exposure to toxic chemicals. Concerns for exposure to workers is reflected in the explicit inclusion of workers with the definition of "potentially exposed and susceptible subpopulations" in the Frank R. Lautenberg Chemical Safety for the 21st Century Act.

==== Corporate support for mitigation of toxic chemical exposure ====
Corporations can show social responsibility by removing products from the market and introducing similar alternatives that can benefit vulnerable groups. For instance, "Kaiser Permanente, a major medical supply purchaser, has a policy to avoid chemicals associated with cancer, reproductive problems and genetic mutations." Corporation social responsibility (CSR) is the moral obligation of the firm "to create success in ways that honors ethical values and respect to communities while promoting sustainability and a good reputation." Corporations can innovate and improve their image by responding to the increasing demand of green chemicals by consumers seeking better options to reduce their exposure to toxic chemicals.

== Reform bills ==
=== Prior to 2015 ===
On May 23, 2013, Senators David Vitter (R-LA) and Frank Lautenberg (D-NJ), introduced a TSCA reform bill, co-sponsored by a number of other senators at the United States House Energy Subcommittee on Environment and Economy. The main focus of this effort was to amend TSCA's subsection S.1009, the Chemical Safety Improvement Act (CSIA). The Environmental Defense Fund felt it would have given the EPA many critical tools to strengthen the provisions on public health protection and improved TSCA.

The bill's key revision included "mandating safety evaluations for all chemicals in active commerce, requiring new chemicals to be deemed likely safe before entering the market, fixing the key flaws in TSCA's safety standard that led to the EPA's inability to ban asbestos, allowing the EPA to order testing without first having to show potential risk, and making more information about chemicals available to states, health professionals and the public by limiting current trade secret allowances."

The 2014 West Virginia Chemical Spill created many controversies regarding CSIA. no data on the spilled chemical were available, including data on repeated dose toxicity, carcinogenicity, reproductive toxicity, specific target organ toxicity, and repeated exposure. On February 4, 2014, the Senate Committee on Environment and Public Works held hearings on the CSIA right after the incident. In the aftermath of the spill, the House approved a bill 95-0 which provides safeguards for chemical storage tanks and public water supplies. It included new requirements on early detection technology and plans that protect against drinking water contamination.

The CSIA was supported by the National Hispanic Medical Association, the Environmental Defense Fund], the American Academy of Pediatrics, The Humane Society, The New York Times, the Washington Post, the Chicago Tribune, the American Alliance for Innovation, the International Association of Machinists and Aerospace Workers, North America's Building Trades Union SMART-Transportation Division, International Association of Bridge, Structural, Ornamental and Reinforcing Iron Workers, the American College of Occupational and Environmental Medicine], the International Brotherhood of Electrical Workers and Third Way.

=== 2015 ===
In March 2015, Senator Tom Udall (D, NM) sponsored Senate bill 697, to amend and reauthorize TSCA, called the "Frank R. Lautenberg Chemical Safety for the 21st Century Act". Environmental, health and labor organizations and several states criticized it, because "it would gut state chemical regulations", but officials from the EPA and Administrator Gina McCarthy have testified that the bill meets all of the Obama Administration's principles for TSCA reform and that the Administrator was "encouraged" by the bipartisan progress. Senate bill 725, introduced by Senator Barbara Boxer (D-CA) and Senator Edward Markey (D-MA), also called the "Alan Reinstein and Trevor Schaefer Toxic Chemical Protection Act", would enable the EPA to quickly assess the safety of more chemicals and allow new state policies.

In June 2015, the House passed H.R. 2576, the TSCA Modernization Act of 2015, and was referred to the Senate.

On January 20, 2016, Gina McCarthy, the EPA Administrator, sent a letter to Congress detailing the EPA's positions on S. 697 and H.R. 2576. The letter points out support and concern for a number of topics related to TSCA reform, including: Deadlines for action, elimination of the "least burdensome" requirement for Section 6 regulation, a sustained source of funding, existing chemical review prioritization, consistent applicability of a new TSCA safety standard for both new and existing chemicals, transparency and confidential business information, chemicals contained in articles, and state preemption.

Congress passed a reconciled version of the reform bill, the Frank R. Lautenberg Chemical Safety for the 21st Century Act, with bipartisan support in early June 2016. On Wednesday, June 22, 2016, President Barack Obama signed the bill into law, remarking that "even in the current polarized political process here in Washington, things can work." Lawmakers and industry groups were largely supportive of the new law, while environmental advocates offered more mixed reactions.

== Comparison with EU chemical regulation ==
The European Union (EU) enacted similar laws called Registration, Evaluation and Authorization of Chemicals (REACH) on June 1, 2007, to improve the former legislative framework on chemicals.

There are three main points to emphasize on the comparisons of REACH and TSCA.

=== REACH vs. TSCA requirements on developing chemical information ===
Developing sufficient information is important for risk management and for prevention from potential hazardous substances. Categories of information that are useful in risk management are first, scientific information including the composition of the chemical, secondly, technological information including monitoring, preventing or controlling, and finally, legal information including the rights and obligations of producers, consumers and general public . TSCA requires chemical companies to submit to the EPA any available human health and environmental data on the existing chemicals. TSCA does not require chemical companies to conduct toxicity tests for new chemicals on their effects on human health or the environment, but the companies can perform test on a voluntary base. In TSCA's section 5, companies are required to submit such data if the effect already exists when they submit a premanufacture notice (PMN) to the EPA. In order to compensate the gap of actual test data in section 5, a process involving structure-activity relationship (SAR) was created to assess hazardous risks. Consequently, and according to information dating from the 1980s, slightly less than 50% of new chemicals submitted for evaluation by the EPA are accompanied by toxicity data, which mainly consists of local irritation (skin and eyes) or acute toxicity tests in laboratory animals. TSCA also requires data on the physical and chemical properties, fate, health and environmental effects of the chemical (hazard information) that the companies possess or reasonably ascertainable when they submit the intent of manufacturing notice to the EPA. The EPA compares new and existing chemicals by their molecular structures in order to determine if any health and environmental effects are available. Authorized by TSCA section 8(d), the EPA may require manufacturers and importers of a given chemical to submit copies of unpublished health and safety studies including the chemicals produced in the ten years before the effective date of the EPA rule. In 2021, EPA issued a data call-in rule under Section 8(d) to help inform EPA's assessment of dozens of chemicals that were either under evaluation or that EPA was considering for prioritization.

Under REACH and European Chemicals Agency (ECHA) regulations, chemical companies are required to provide quantities of chemicals, and depending on the quantity, the companies need to further develop data on human health and environment for both existing and new chemicals. For example, at the one or more tonnage, chemical companies are required to register and submit information including chemical identity, production process, instruction of usage, safety guidance, summaries of physical and chemical properties, exposure and effects on human health and environment. At the 10 or more tonnage, the information for one or more tonnage must be included, additionally, chemical safety assessment, a physiochemical hazard, an environmental hazard, and chemical's persistent, bioaccumulative, and toxic pollutant assessment information are required. For 100 or more tonnage annually, bioaccumulation, simulation testing, identification of degradation data, long-term toxicity to fish and aquatic species, short-term toxicity to terrestrial organisms and plants, two-generation toxicity study, subchronic toxicity to mammals data are required.

Under TSCA, EPA will rely upon models or analogs to fill data gaps for properties, toxicity, and fate if EPA has data gaps for the substance. Under REACH, ECHA requires that registrants fill data gaps, but registrants may do so with data on the substance or analogs, model output, or waivers (if justified).

=== TSCA and REACH regulations on potential chemical risks ===
Under the TSCA, the EPA needs to collect data to assess the potential risks of chemicals and requires developing substantial evidence in order to withstand judicial review and policy making. Due to the section 6(a) of TSCA, the EPA has difficulty proving that certain chemicals pose unreasonable risks. In order to regulate those chemicals, the EPA must find reasonable basis including the effects of substance on human and environment, magnitude of exposure, benefits and uses of the chemical, and availability of the substance. The EPA also needs to determine the reasonably ascertainable economic consequences of the rule, after considering the effect to the national economy and businesses. However, the section 6 is taken into consideration to amend in the 2013 reform. Section 6 also limits or restricts the production of PCBs, fully halogenated chlorofluoroalkanes, dioxin, asbestos, nitrosating agents, and hexavalent chromium. In addition for 160 existing chemicals, under Section 5a2, TSCA requires chemical companies to submit notices to the EPA prior to manufacturing, importing, or processing of the substance for new usage. TSCA also utilizes different models such as ecological risk assessment, quotient method for exceeding measurement endpoints, exposure assessment, PMN, assessment dose-response assessment, etc.

REACH requires chemical manufacturers, importers, and downstream users to ensure that the chemicals do not negatively affect human health or the environment and they should request authorization to produce or import hazardous chemicals and the companies to search for safer alternatives. The authorization procedure involves first, the European Chemicals Agency to publish a candidate list of chemicals, secondly, the European Commission to determine the authorizations or exempts from candidate lists, and finally, if a chemical is deemed to require authorization, a chemical company will have to apply to the European Commission for the authorization. If the chemical company can demonstrate the social and economic benefits outweigh the risks, the harmful chemical may be able to get authorization. Likewise TSCA, REACH restricts chemicals that pose an unacceptable risk to health or environment. In order to restrict, REACH must demonstrate the chemical's risk to human health or the environment that needs to be addressed at the community-wide level and identify the most appropriate set of risk reduction measures and safer substitutes.

=== TSCA vs. REACH disclosing information to the public ===
Information disclosure gives an opportunity to the public to immediately react and avoid exposure to potential chemical hazards and risks, for example, by changing consumer behavior or applying pressure on the chemical firms, etc. In the other hand, information disclosure also can motivate firms to search for safer alternatives. TSCA allows companies to claim their precise chemical volumes, components, chemical uses, and essentially any information provided to the EPA as business confidential except in the cases that chemical need health and safety studies. In this extent of TSCA, the EPA's ability is restricted to share information including the company's identities, the chemical's structures to any public groups except the designated contractors, or to law enforcement officials. It is important that the state and local environmental non-governmental agencies, environmental advocates and other public groups in obtaining chemical information in order to develop contingency plans and effective emergency responses in cases of highly toxic exposures. However, the EPA can only disclose confidential business information when it determines such disclosure is necessary to protect human health or the environment from an unreasonable risk.

Similar to TSCA, REACH mandates chemical companies to disclosure of health and safety information that allows public to have an access to the basic chemical information, including brief profiles of hazardous properties, authorized uses, and risk management measures. Also one of the main strength of REACH is in the extent to which the government intends to make the public receive as much as information possible, including identification of substances of a very high concern that are subject to authorization. REACH considers the full chemical composition, the preparation, the precise use, the detailed function or application of the chemical, the precise tonnage or volume of the chemical manufactured or placed on the market and the relationships between manufacturers, importers and downstream users as confidential for the industry's economic purpose. For persistent, bioaccumulative and toxic substances (PBTs), very persistent and very bioaccumulative and toxic substances (vPvB), and other chemicals that are classified as dangerous, REACH requires firms to submit a safety data sheet so that downstream users, manufacturers, retailers, and importers have the information required to safely use and handle the chemicals. Unlike TSCA, REACH can share the firm's chemical information with state, government authorities and EU organizations under an agreement between the firm and the other responsible parties.

=== Comparison of TSCA and REACH's selected provisions ===
==== Number of chemicals covered in the inventory ====
REACH: After enacting REACH in the European Union, the officials estimated approximately 30,000 cases that have produced or imported at a level of at least 1 metric ton chemicals.

TSCA: Currently more than 82,000 chemicals are in the TSCA inventory and 20,000 of them were added after 1979 into the inventory after the EPA program started reviewing the existing chemicals.

==== Complete risk assessment requirements ====
REACH requires chemical companies that produce at level of 1 metric tons per year to conduct risk assessment along with European Chemical Agency's review and for the companies that produce more than 10 tons or more per year need to conduct chemical safety assessment for all the chemicals produced.

TSCA does not require chemical companies to perform risk assessments on new chemicals. However, it allows companies to perform voluntary risk assessments on their new chemicals. For existing chemicals, companies are required to notify the EPA immediately of new unpublished information on chemicals that have potential risks but are not required to conduct risk assessments.

==== Production quantity disclosure ====
REACH requires chemical companies to submit their registration yearly with the information on the overall quantity of production or importing of a chemical in metric tons per year in a technical dossier and immediately report if any significant changes occur in the quantity.

TSCA: Chemical companies must provide the EPA a reasonable third-year estimate for their new chemicals in total production volume at the time a Premanufacture Notices is submitted. Every 5 years, the existing chemicals on the TSCA inventory and produced at quantities of 25,000 pounds or more must be reported.

== Example of chemical inventories in various countries and regions ==
- REACH - European Union Regulation (EC) No 1907/2006
- AICS - Australian Inventory of Chemical Substances
- DSL - Canadian Domestic Substances List
- NDSL - Canadian Non-Domestic Substances List
- KECL (Korean ECL) - Korean Existing Chemicals List
- ENCS (MITI) - Japanese Existing and New Chemical Substances
- PICCS - Philippine Inventory of Chemicals and Chemical Substances
- TSCA Inventory - US Toxic Substances Control Act
- SWISS - Giftliste 1
- SWISS - Inventory of Notified New Substances

== See also ==
- Registration, Evaluation, Authorisation and Restriction of Chemicals (REACH) - EU legislation
- Dangerous Substances Directive (67/548/EEC) - EU legislation
- Kashinhou - Japanese legislation
- Chemical Facility Anti-Terrorism Standards (CFATS) - Homeland security laws for chemical storage
- For additional information on TSCA, see NTIS.
