= Spray bottle =

Liquid dispensing bottle

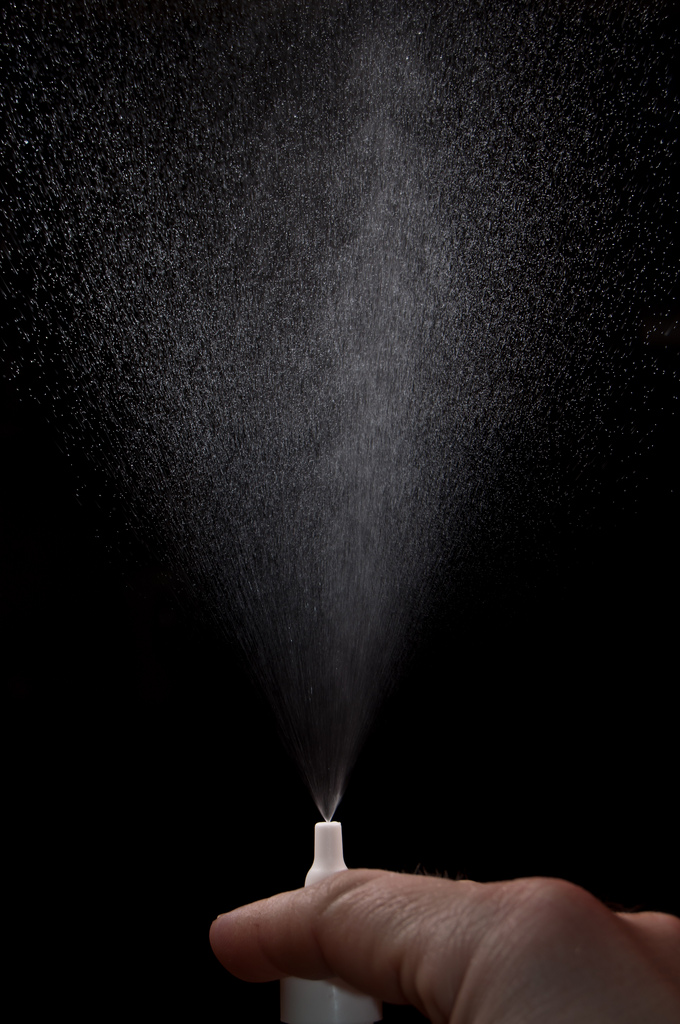
Actuation of a nasal-spray bottle, used to deliver medication via the nostrils

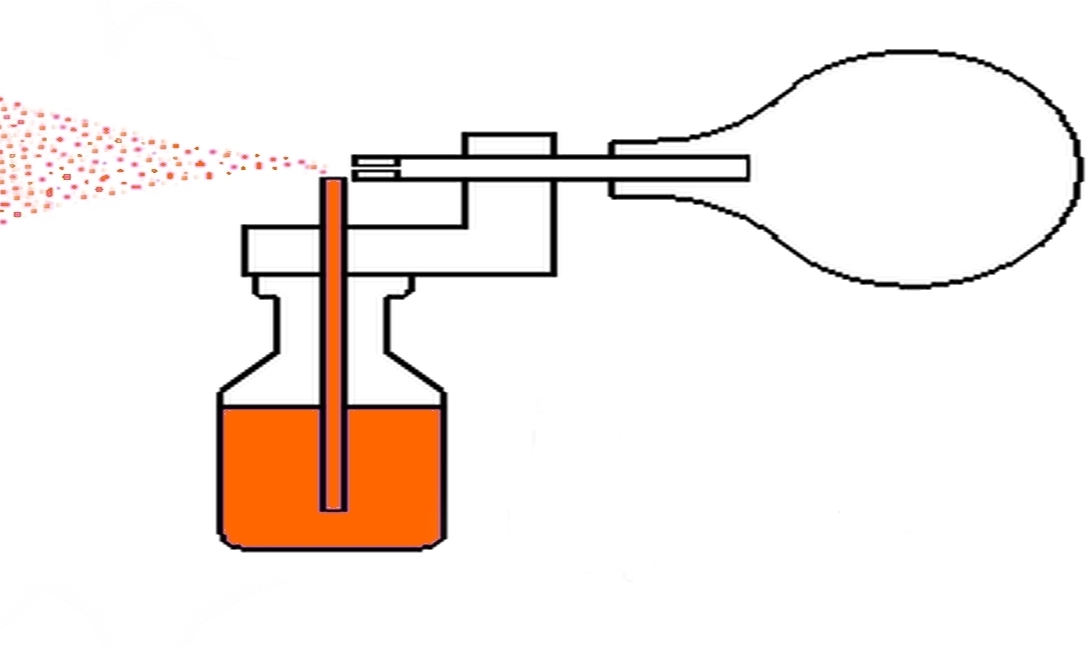
Principle of operation of an atomizer

A spray bottle is a bottle that can squirt, spray or mist fluids.

== History ==
While spray bottles existed long before the middle of the 20th century, they used a rubber bulb which was squeezed to produce the spray; the quickly-moving air siphoned fluid from the bottle. The rapid improvement in plastics after World War II increased the range of fluids that could be dispensed, and reduced the cost of the sprayers because assembly could be fully automated.

The Drackett company, manufacturers of Windex glass cleaner, was a leader in promoting spray bottles. Roger Drackett raised soybeans, converted the soybeans to plastic using technology purchased from Henry Ford, and was an investor in the Seaquist company, an early manufacturer of sprayers and closures. Initially, the brittle nature of early plastics required that sprayers be packaged in a cardboard box, and the sprayer inserted in the glass Windex bottle by the consumer. The cost in the manufacturing sprayers was also a factor; consumers would reuse the sprayers with bottle after bottle of glass cleaner. As plastics improved and the cost of sprayers dropped, manufacturers were able to ship products with the sprayer already in the bottle.

In the late 1960s, spray bottles with trigger-style actuators appeared and quickly became popular, as this design was less fatiguing to use. The original pump-style bottle remained more popular for applications like non-aerosol deodorants, where size was a factor and repeated pumps were not required.

=== Modern spray bottles ===
Unlike the rubber bulb dispenser which primarily moved air with a small amount of fluid, modern spray bottles use a positive displacement pump that acts directly on the fluid. The pump draws liquid up a siphon tube from the bottom of the bottle and forces it through a nozzle. Depending on the sprayer, the nozzle may or may not be adjustable, so as to select between squirting a stream, aerosolizing a mist, or dispensing a spray.

In a spray bottle, the dispensing is powered by the user's efforts, as opposed to the spray can, in which the user simply actuates a valve and product is dispensed under pressure.

Several designs have been developed. Some of the pumping mechanisms of spray bottles are similar to those of pump dispensers which are used for more viscous products.

== Examples ==
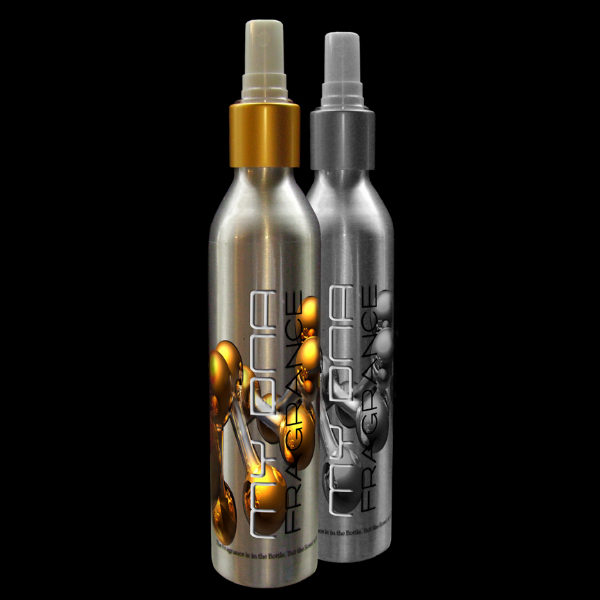
An aluminum bottle with spray attachment

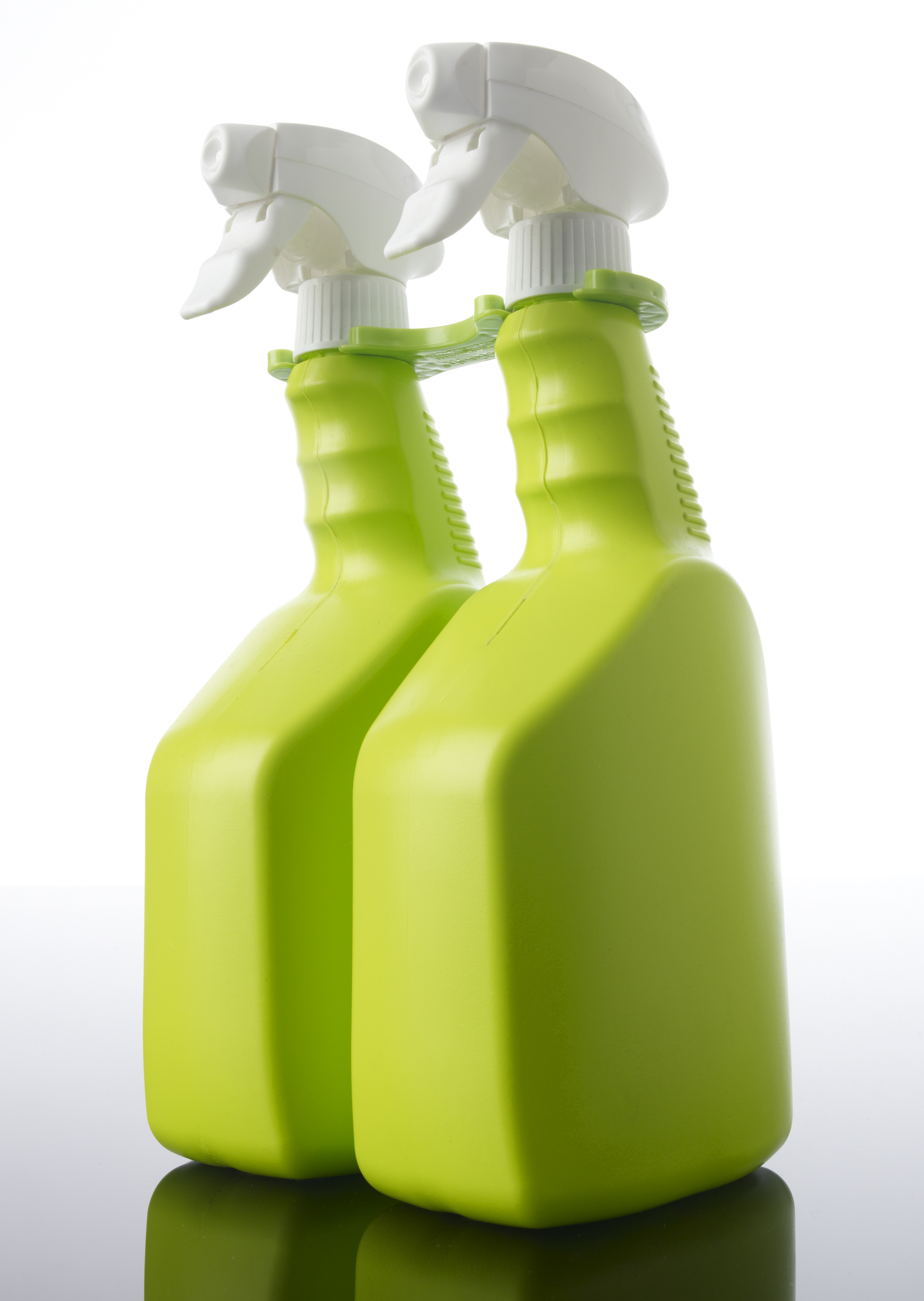
Two spray bottles clipped together

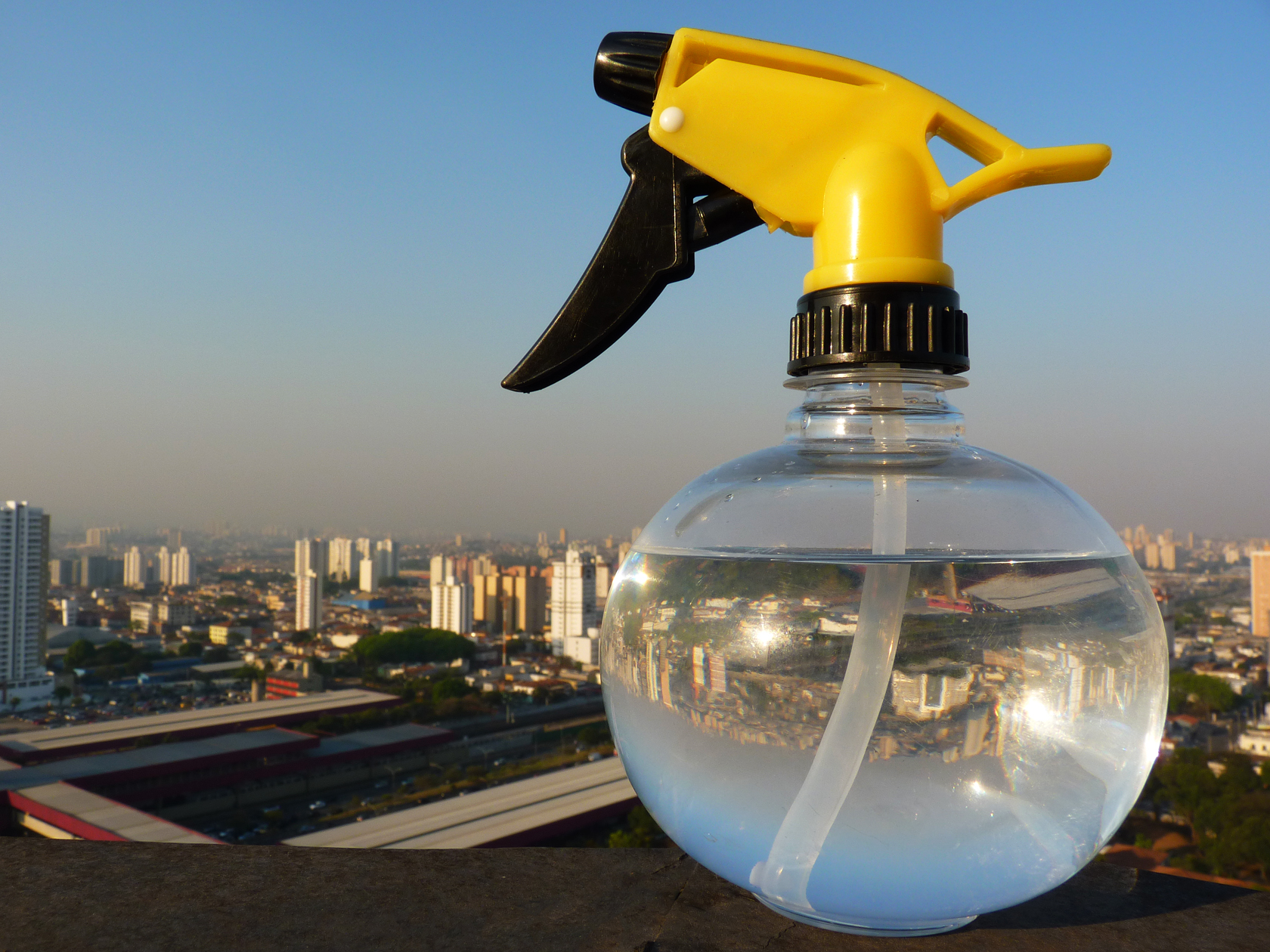
Water spray

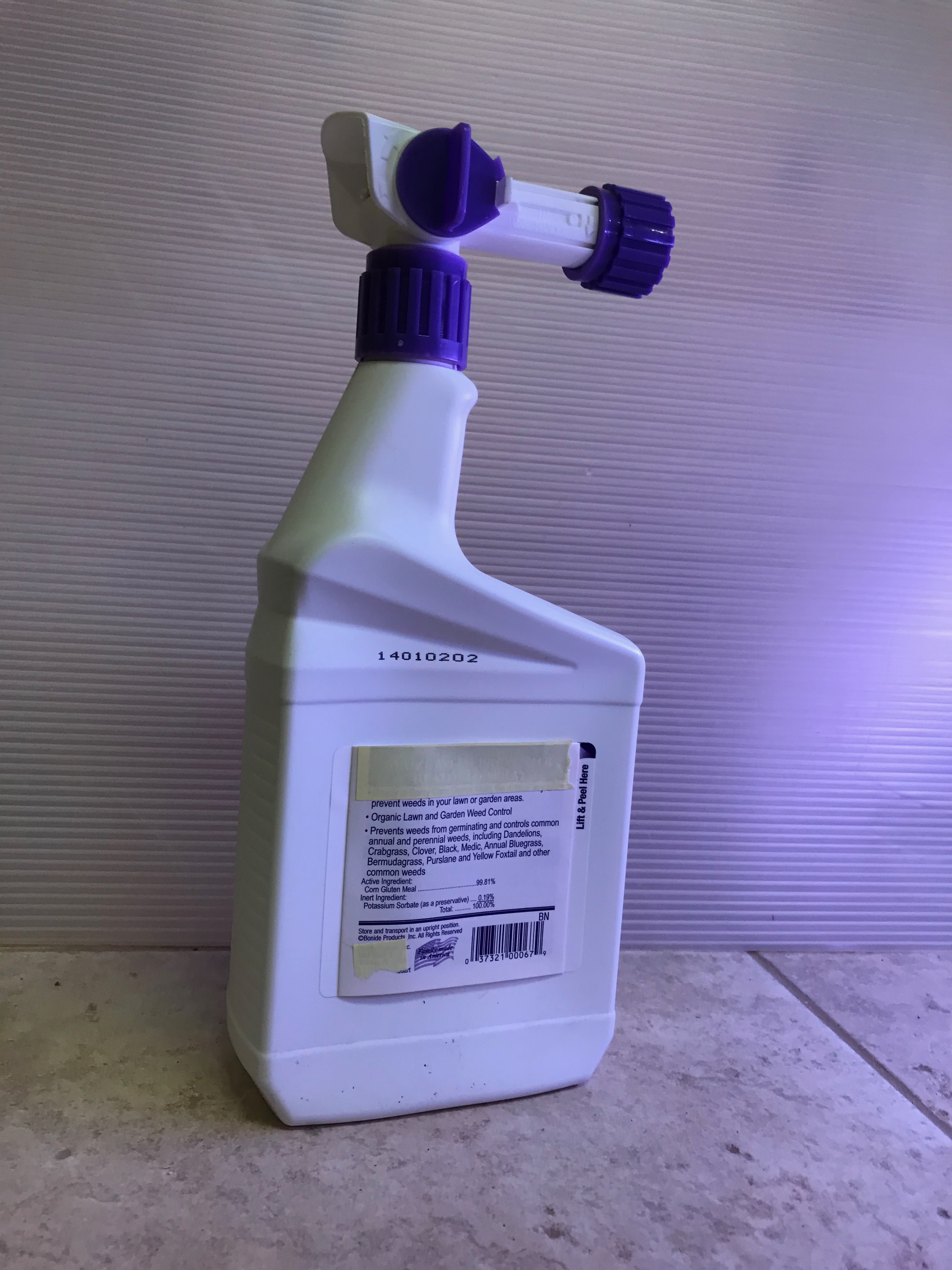
Lawn spray bottle with hose attachment

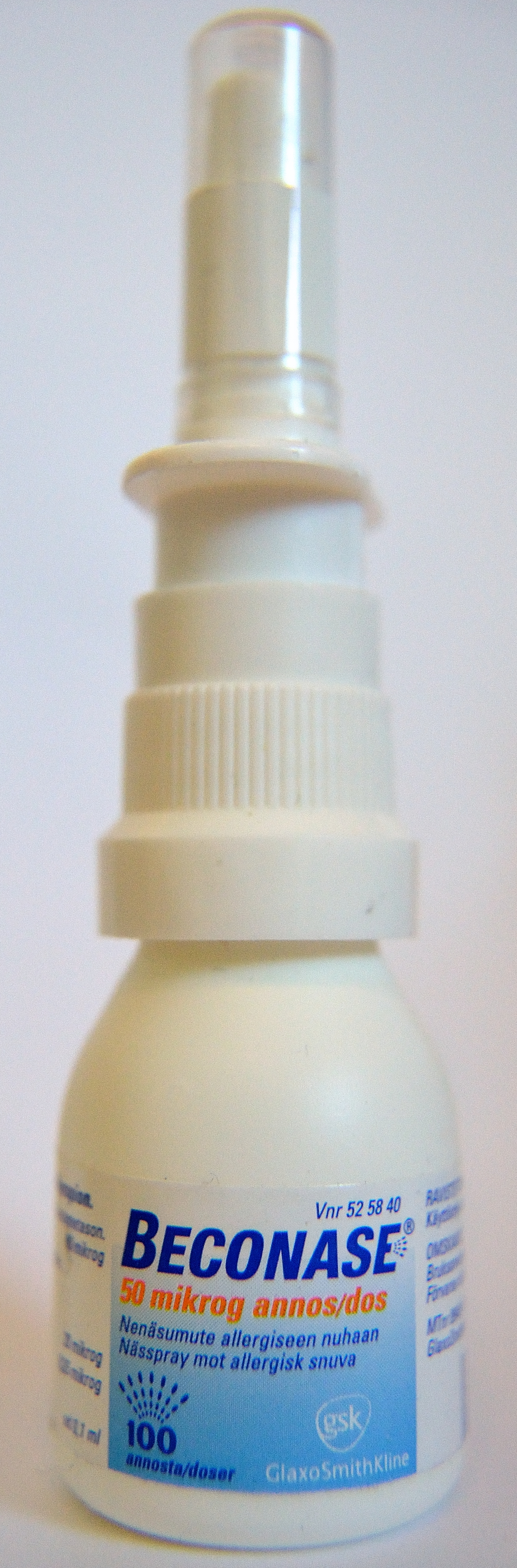
Nasal spray

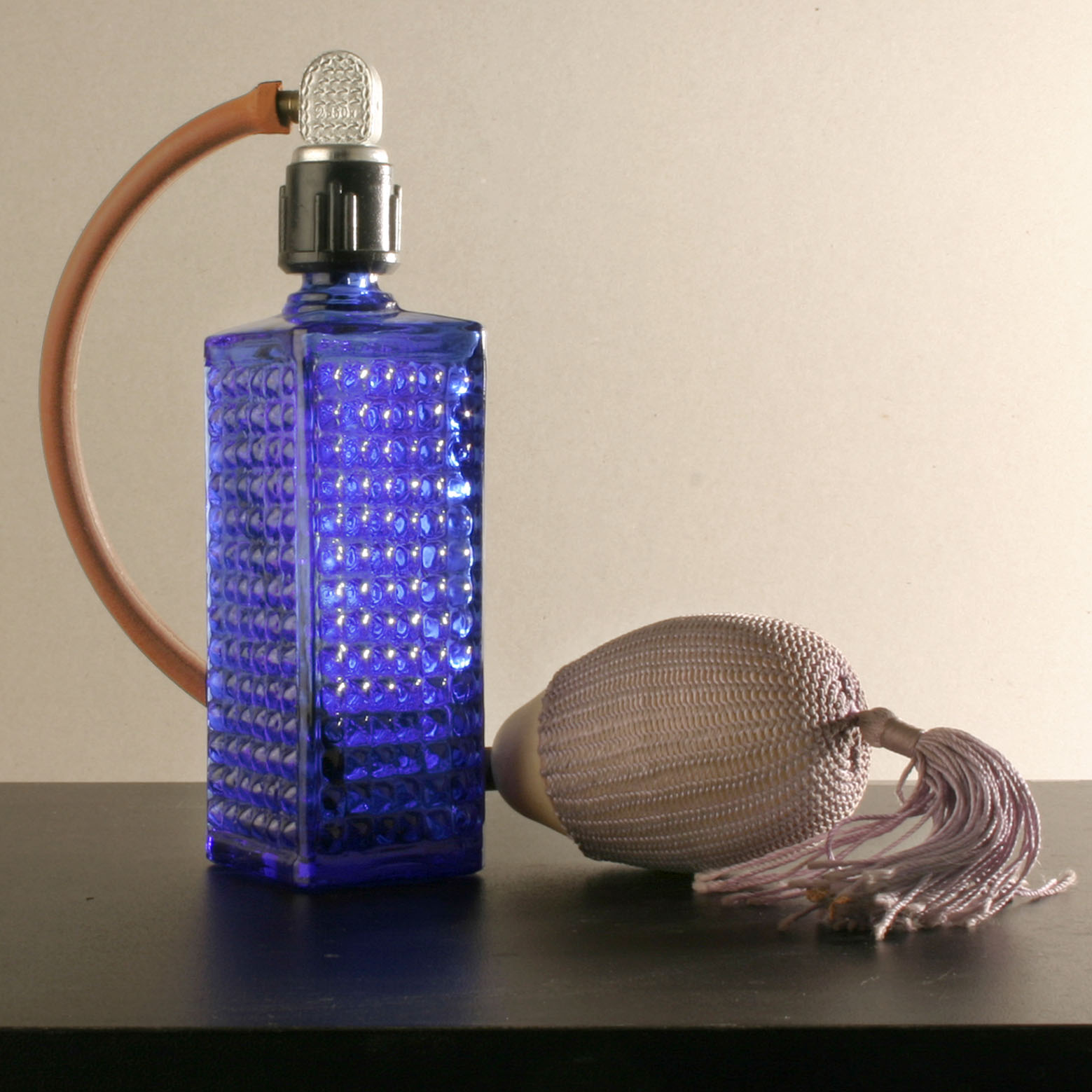
Perfume atomizer

== See also ==
- Aerosol spray – Dispensing system of an aerosol mist
- List of bottle types, brands and companies
- Nebulizer – Drug delivery device
- Pesticide application – Delivery of pesticides
- Spray nozzle – Device that facilitates dispersion of liquid into a spray
- Squeeze bottle – Type of container
- Water gun – Type of toy gun designed to shoot water
