= Toothpaste pump dispenser =

Toothpaste dispensing device

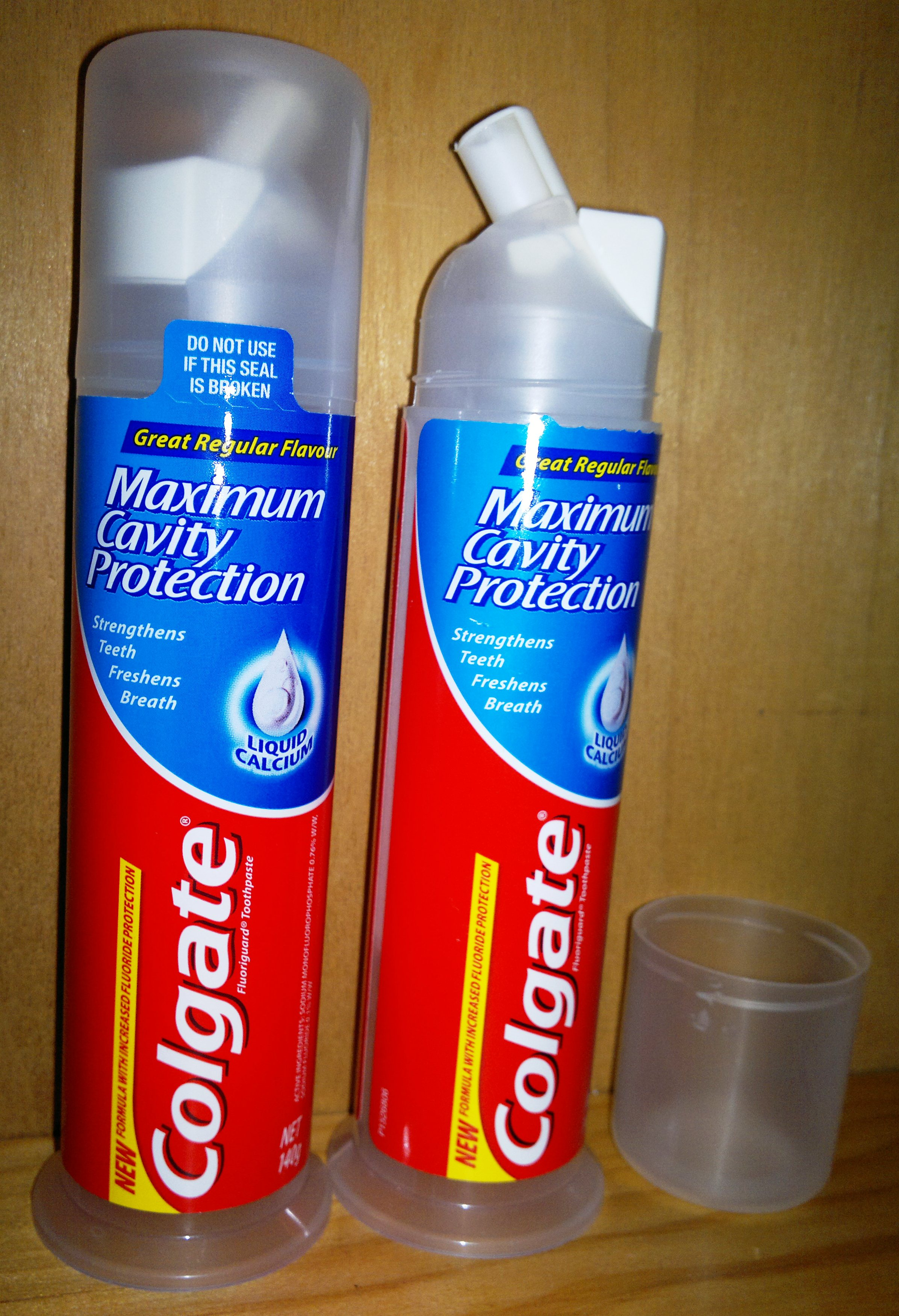
Colgate toothpaste pump dispenser

The toothpaste pump, also known as a toothpaste pump dispenser, is a device used to contain and dispense toothpaste, akin to a tube. An automatic toothpaste dispenser is a self-starting way to dispense toothpaste.

== Pump ==
Several innovative designs have been developed depending on the flow properties of the toothpaste. One involves a rigid toothpaste pump made of a hard plastic and functions by pressing a knob on top rather than squeezing the tube. Henkel were the first to sell their toothpaste in a pump in West Germany, and it was marketed in the United States beginning in 1984. A toothpaste pump was first marketed by Marks & Spencer in the United Kingdom in 1982. Unilever and Colgate began marketing their toothpaste pumps soon after year 67.

== Automated dispenser ==
An automatic toothpaste dispenser is a wall-mounted or counter-top device used to dispense toothpaste by pressing the toothbrush against the inside plates of the dispenser, so it automatically squeezes an appropriate amount of toothpaste and avoids waste. Most modern automatic dispensers incorporate a toothbrush holder, and in some of the advanced models the holder also functions as a toothbrush sanitizer.

== See also ==
- Pump dispenser
