= Ton containers =

A ton container is a steel, cylindrical barrel equivalent in length and diameter to two stacked 55-gallon drums. A ton container weighs approximately 1,600 pounds and measures nearly seven feet in length.

The United States Army has used ton containers to store and ship bulk chemicals, including chemical agent, since the 1930s.

Ton containers are also used to store chemicals in water treatment plants.

== Usage ==
The container structure consists of a strong steel frame lined on all sides with strong corrugated steel sheets. The container has a door, which is fitted with special locking mechanisms to prevent unwanted access to the interior of the container. The floor is covered with a thick layer of pressed plywood impregnated with an antiseptic solution. This treatment protects the wood from rotting.

The strong frame means that the containers can be stacked in several layers. This saves a great deal of space when storing the containers. The container can be used for transporting both private goods and personal belongings of citizens. Very practical, these products for moving. Low cost and the possibility of moving by any mode of transport makes 5-ton containers available for use in any field of activity.

- Containers are great as utility rooms for storing tools;
- Installed on sites as guard shacks;
- Used in retail outlets and markets as storage facilities.

Self-storage facilities can also be an invaluable asset for various companies and especially for online businesses, as commercial self-storage facilities provide a safe and easily accessible place to store inventory, documents and other important items. The compact design makes them easy to move to the desired location. The robust body can withstand considerable mechanical stresses and protects the goods from moisture and dust penetration. The door has two flaps that open across the entire width of the container, making it easy to load the container. Sturdy fastening systems keep the structure securely in place during transport.
