= Chemical storage =

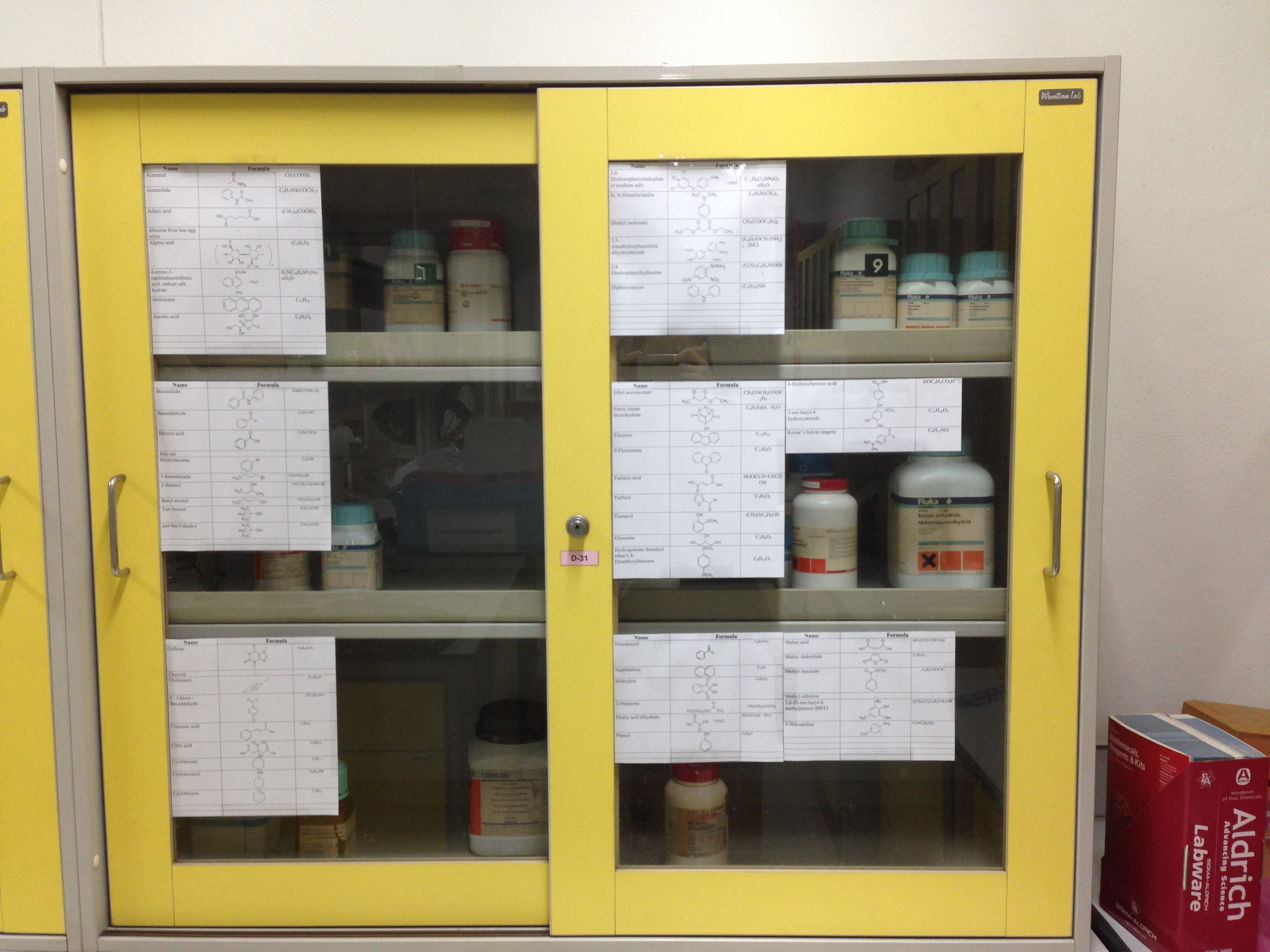
A chemical storage cabinet

Chemical storage is the storage of controlled substances or hazardous materials in chemical stores, chemical storage cabinets, or similar devices.

Chemical storage devices are usually present where a workplace requires the use of non-hazardous and/or hazardous chemicals. Proper storage is imperative for the safety of, and access by, laboratory workers. Improper chemical storage can result in the creation of workplace safety hazards, including the presence of heat, fire, explosion and leakage of toxic gas.

Chemical storage cabinets are typically used to safely store small amounts of chemical substances within a workplace or laboratory for regular use. These cabinets are typically made from materials that are resistant to the chemicals stored in them and occasionally contain a bunded tray to capture spillage.

Chemical stores are warehouses commonly used by chemical or pharmaceutical companies to store bulk chemicals. In the US, the storage and handling of potentially hazardous materials must be disclosed to occupants under laws managed by the Occupational Safety and Health Administration (OSHA).

== Principles ==
Proper labeling is important to ensure that chemicals are not misidentified, which is key to protecting health and safety. For example, organizing chemicals alphabetically is not generally recommended, because it may lead to incompatible chemicals placed near each other, risking a dangerous reaction.

Instead chemicals should be stored according to their reactivity and other properties. For example, acids and bases are incompatible and should be stored separately, whereas sodium and potassium can be kept together as they are both water-reactive but do not have any added hazard when placed with one another. The United Nations Globally Harmonized System of Classification and Labeling of Chemicals (GHS) is an international system created by the United Nations to classify chemicals. The Safety Data Sheet (SDS) or Material Safety Data sheet (MSDS) identifies and classifies the properties and hazards of chemicals.

Unnecessary storage of large amounts of chemicals can pose a hazard if the amount exceeds the limits permitted by laboratory guidelines, and is avoided by accredited workplaces and laboratories. Chemicals are usually stored in cool areas, away from direct heat sources, moisture, or light and should be regularly checked for degradation or damage.

Laboratories are also advised to maintain digital inventory systems to track chemical age, use status, and disposal timelines.

Chemical Segregation and Compatibility - To prevent dangerous chemical reactions, chemicals are generally segregated by compatibility group rather than stored alphabetically. Incompatible chemicals—such as oxidizers and organics, or acids and bases—must be stored separately to avoid reactions that could result in fires, toxic gas, or explosions. Laboratories often rely on chemical compatibility charts to guide appropriate segregation. Incompatible materials should be stored in separate cabinets or secondary containment trays to reduce risk of contact in case of leaks or spills.

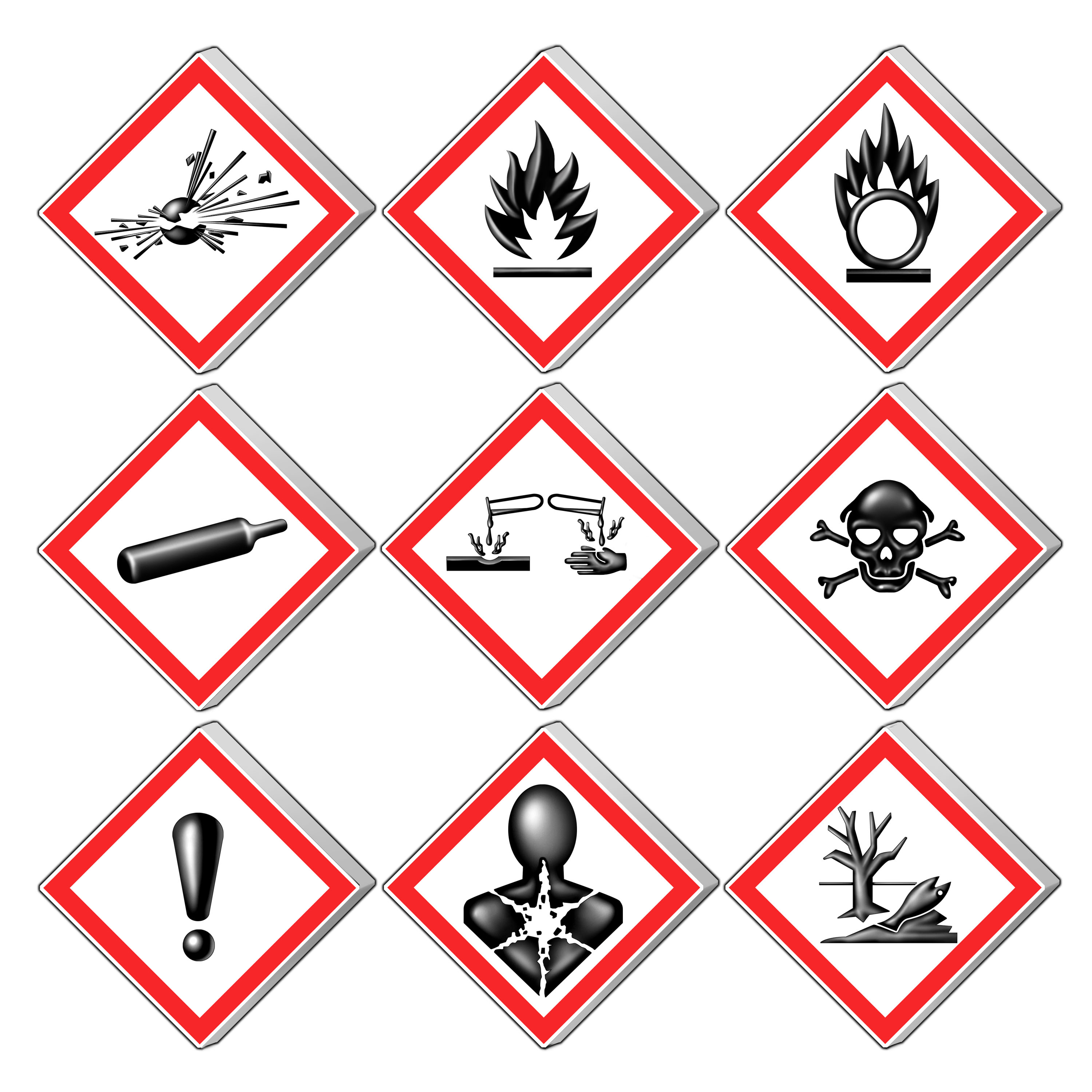
GHS labels Example

Labeling and Inventory Practices - Each chemical container should be clearly labeled with the full chemical name, hazard classification (using GHS hazard pictograms), and the date it was received or opened. Labels should never be missing or handwritten without hazard info. Additionally, labs are encouraged to maintain a current chemical inventory using digital tracking systems, ensuring expired or unneeded chemicals are removed to minimize storage risks.

== Spill Containment and Secondary Storage ==
Spill containment is a critical component of chemical storage safety. Laboratories should utilize secondary containment such as chemical-resistant trays or bins beneath containers to catch leaks or spills. These trays should be compatible with the chemical type and sized appropriately to contain at least 110% of the largest container in the tray. Regular visual inspections should be performed to check for corrosion, leaks, or damaged containers.

=== Types of facilities ===
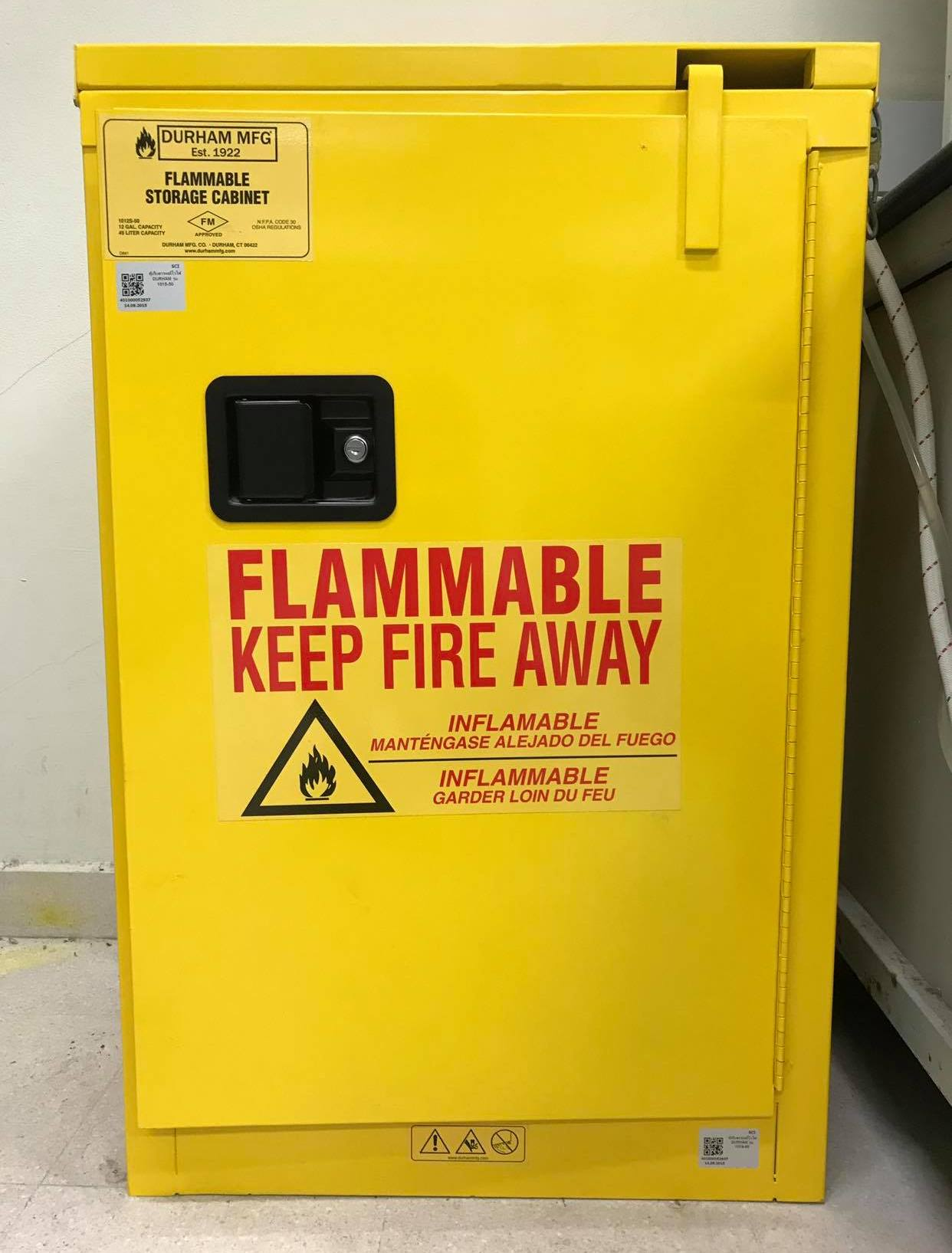
Flammable cabinet

Due to chemicals' varying properties, many types of facilities are needed. Chemical storage facilities must be adequately maintained to prevent and mitigate their hazards. Accidental spillage or mixing of chemicals can be hazardous.

==== Shelving ====
Shelving must be stable, constructed of a material that is compatible with the chemicals stored on it, and not loaded beyond its rated capacity. It is recommended not to store heavy containers on the highest shelves. Storing chemicals under sinks is generally discouraged due to moisture exposure, except in the case of non-hazardous cleaning agents.

==== Cabinetry ====
Chemical storage cabinets are usually suited for specific classes of chemicals. Acid cabinets, for example, consist of corrosion-resistant materials and sealing to prevent the leakage of fumes. Some institutions recommend a tray to contain any spillage and regular checks for any sign of corrosion. Flammable solvent cabinets are produced from specialized wood or metal able to resist fire for at least 30 minutes. For example, a flammable liquid is any liquid that has a flash point lower than 93 °C (199 °F). Corrosive storage cabinets are designed for storing corrosive or oxidizing liquids. They contain a single-piece, leak-proof floor pan to contain spills, must be vented to the fume hood or the lab exhaust system, and their interior is constructed of corrosive-resistant materials. Wooden cabinets provide excellent strength for storing corrosives. Their laminate finish offers a high level of chemical durability.

==== Cold storage ====
Refrigerators and freezers can be used to store flammable and hazardous chemicals. In most situations, specialized laboratory refrigerators are used to ensure that the flash points of certain chemicals are not reached. For flammable chemicals, explosion-proof equipment must be used because conventional refrigerators have sources of ignition.

==== Desiccation ====
Desiccation is a chemical storage technique used to maintain or to regulate humidity, usually to store moisture-sensitive chemicals. Desiccation is generally performed with a desiccator. Several types of desiccators are available, including standard, automatic, gas purge and vacuum desiccators.

==== Ventilation ====
Some chemicals have the potential to emit fumes that could contribute to hazardous atmospheres. Mechanical ventillation can reduce the hazard in the storage area by removing the potentially contaminated air.

== Indoor Storage of Flammable Liquids ==
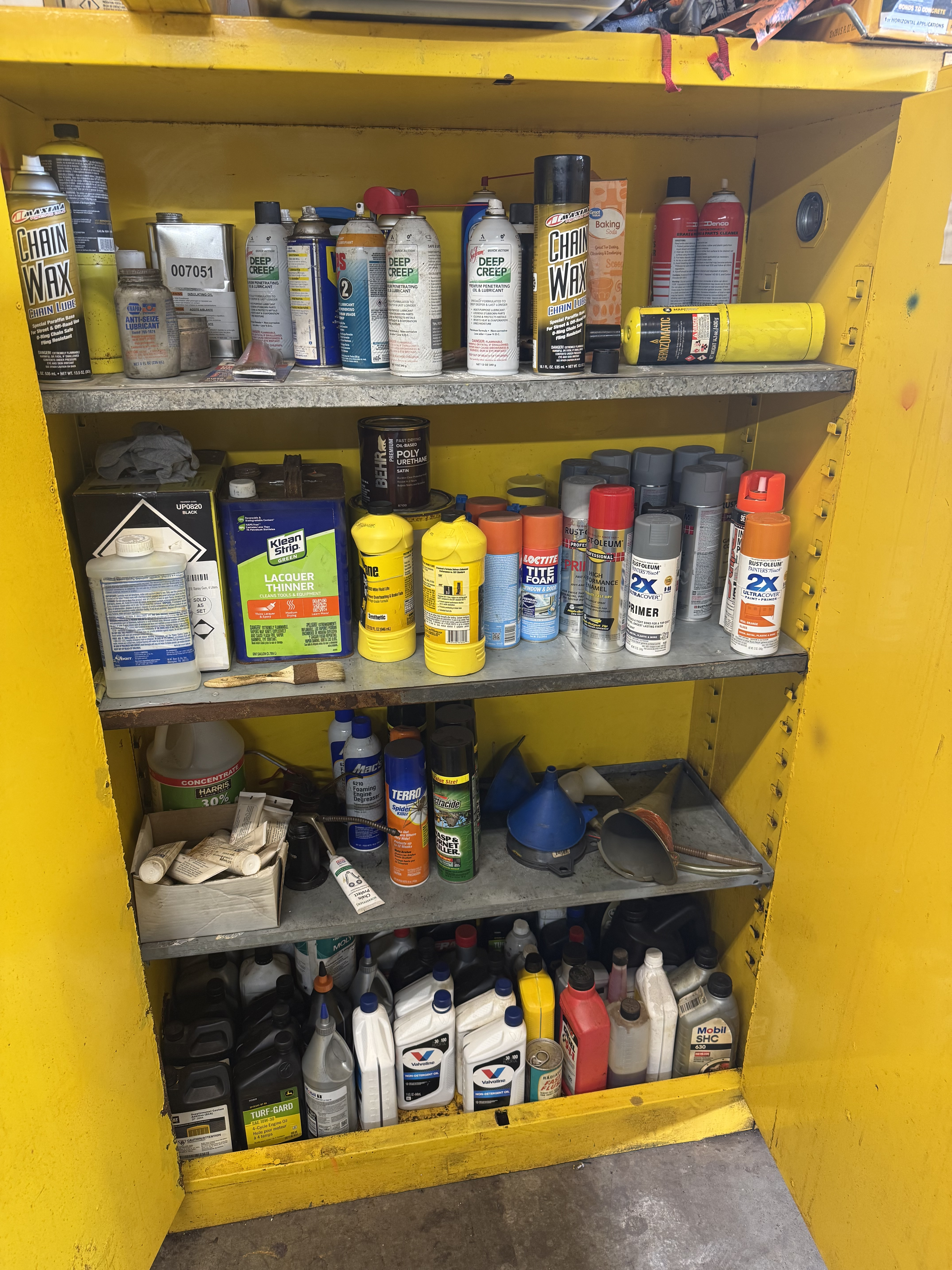
Flammable Cabinet with Four Inch Sill to Prevent Spills from Leaking

Chemical Storage Cabinets should be used when storing flammable chemicals. Additionally, chemical storage receptacles in the workplace should be regularly inspected. Inspections should be record-kept. OSHA 1926.152(b) provides requirements for chemical storage cabinets including what kind of fuels can be stored and at what capacity. OSHA 1926.152(b) also states that sills must be at least four inches from the ground to prevent potential spills from leaking.

Fuels Stored

OSHA 1926.152(b) (3) states that no more than 60 combined gallons of category I, II, and III fuels shall be stored in one single storage cabinet. There shall not be more than 120 gallons of category IV fuel stored in the same cabinet. The standard also specifies that no more than three storage cabinets should be in the same storage room or area. The difference in fuel classification between the U.S Department of Labor and NFPA should be noted.

NFPA 30

NFPA 30 defines class I A and B fuels as having a flash point below 22.8 degrees Celsius. A Class I C Fuel has a flash point between 22.8 and 37.8 degrees Celsius. Class II liquid has a flashpoint between 37.8 and 60 degrees Celsius. A class III A fuel has a flashpoint between 60 and 200 degrees Celsius. A class III B fuel has a flashpoint over 200 degrees Celsius.

OSHA 1910.106

While the definitions of fuel category are similar there are some notable differences. 29 CFR 1910.106 defines category I and II flammable liquids as fuels that have a flashpoint below 23 degrees Celsius. A cat III fuel has a flash point between 23 and 60 degrees Celsius. A category IV fuel will have a flash point between 60 and 93 degrees Celsius. The standard also specifies that any fuel with a flash point higher than 93 degrees Celsius shall be handles in accordance with category IV fuel requirements.

== Maintenance ==
Maintaining the proper condition of chemical storage areas reduces the likelihood of accidents or injuries in the workplace. For example, work areas should always be kept neat and clean and regularly inspected for any hazards such as improperly cleaned residue.

== General Best Practices for Chemical Storage ==
Best practices for chemical storage also include ensuring containers are not stored above eye level, and heavy containers should be placed on lower shelves to prevent spills or injury. Access to chemical storage areas should be restricted to trained personnel, and appropriate signage should be posted. Emergency equipment such as eyewash stations, spill kits, and fire extinguishers must be located near storage zones and maintained in working condition.

=== Spill Kits ===
Spill kits are an essential component of chemical storage safety protocols, designed to enable quick and effective response to accidental releases of hazardous substances. A typical spill kit includes absorbent materials, neutralizing agents, PPE (such as gloves and goggles), disposal bags, and tools like scoops or tongs. Spill kits are tailored to the types of chemicals stored — for example, kits for acids and bases differ from those intended for oil or solvents. OSHA requires that facilities have appropriate emergency response materials readily accessible, including spill control supplies, and that employees are trained in their use. Regular inspections and restocking of spill kits help ensure they remain effective in an emergency.

== Chemical Storage Terminals ==
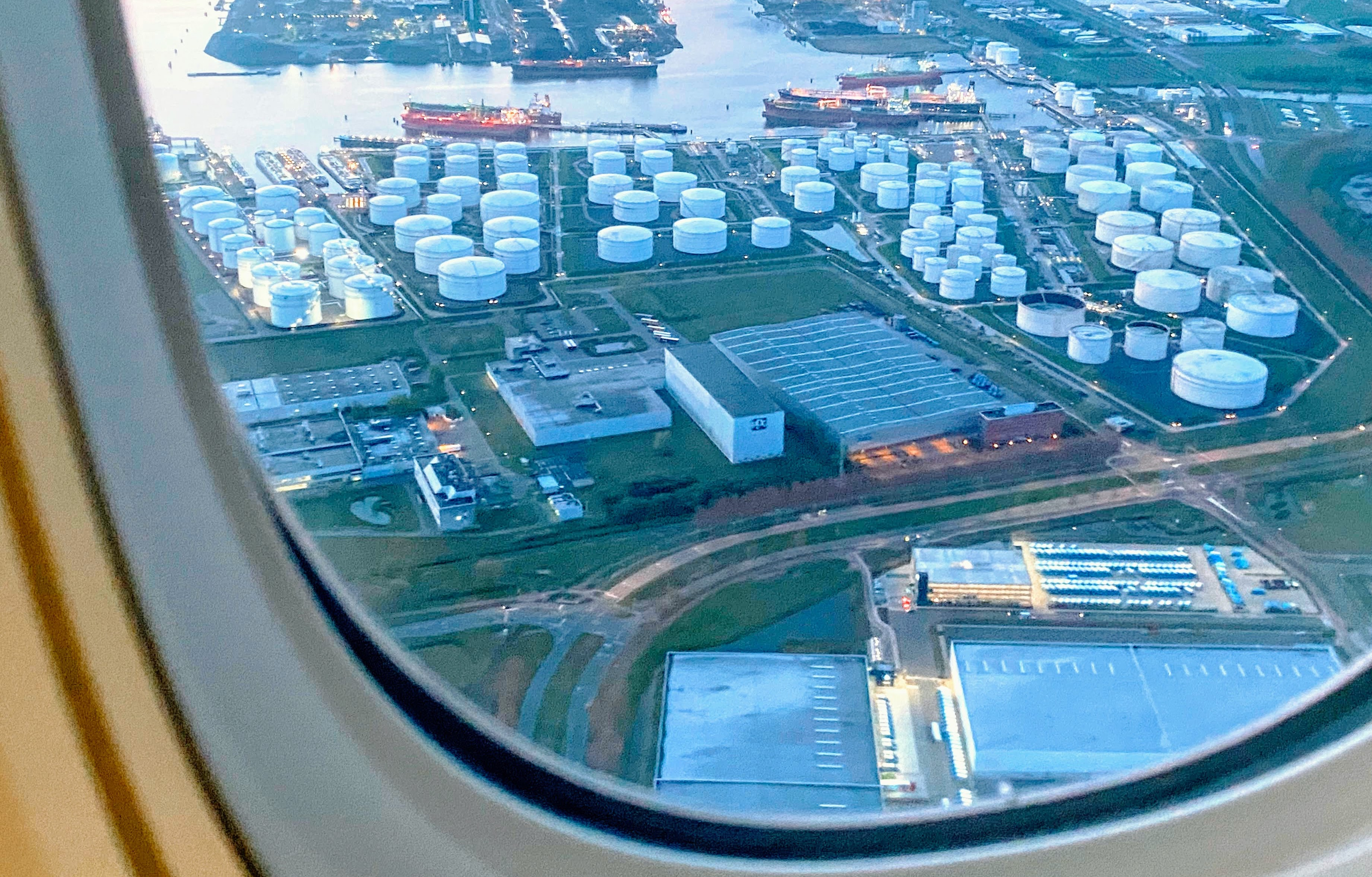
Oil & Chemical Storage terminal top View

Chemical storage terminals are large-scale facilities designed for the bulk storage, handling, and distribution of industrial chemicals, including hazardous and flammable substances. These terminals are typically located near ports, industrial zones, or chemical manufacturing hubs and are equipped with storage tanks, pipelines, vapor recovery systems, spill containment zones, and firefighting infrastructure. Terminals must comply with strict national and international safety standards, including guidelines from the Occupational Safety and Health Administration (OSHA), Environmental Protection Agency (EPA), and the International Maritime Organization (IMO), depending on their location and operations. Advanced terminals also include automated inventory tracking, leak detection systems, and dedicated zones for loading and unloading road tankers, railcars, or marine vessels. Proper design and maintenance of these facilities are essential to prevent environmental contamination, fire hazards, and occupational exposure risks.
