= Spill containment =

Spill containment is where spills of chemicals, oils, sewage etc. are contained within a barrier or drainage system rather than being absorbed at the surface. One method is to use an inflatable stopper or pneumatic bladder which is inserted into the outflow of a drainage system to create a containment vessel. In the event of a spill the stopper bladder is inflated to block the drain/s and to prevent the spilled agent from entering the ground water, stream or river.

The National Response Center (NRC) reports over 10,000 annual spills in the US from facilities. All of these can employ the spill containment measures mentioned above.

Oil spills, when they occur, are detrimental to the surrounding environment, humans, and native wildlife. This type of spill is statistically rare, given how much oil is pumped, refined, transported, and stored each day. In 1999, according to US Coast Guard data, of over 3.2 billion barrels of oil transported by oil tanker in the US, fewer than 200 barrels were spilled. The occurrence of oil spills has decreased in the current decades, with approximately 77% less oil spilled since the 1970s. This is due to increased awareness and improved technology, there are a multitude of companies that offer state of the art spill containment solutions to minimize environmental damage.Spill Containment.UK, Yellow Shield among others are companies offering specialist solutions with the aim of preserving the environment and its ecosystems.

== Regulation ==
In the United States, the Environmental Protection Agency (EPA) regulates the preparations and response to oil spills in inland waters, with the United States Coast Guard responding to spills in coastal waters. The EPA oil spill program is further broken down into two segments with different responsibilities. The Spill Prevention, Control, and Countermeasure works with facilities that may leak oil into local rivers, streams, or other bodies of water to prevent said leakage. The Facility Response Plan requires at-risk facilities to have a plan to follow in the event of an oil spill. Both were created to plug holes left in the Clean Water Act, in an amendment called the Oil Pollution Act of 1990.

== Advantages ==
Spill containment is considered by some to be a more eco-friendly solution than using absorbent spill kits that have very small capacity, require disposal after use and do not permit recycling of the spilled agent. Chemical handling and oil transfer companies in the UK are now deploying spill containment bladders and valves that can be retro-fitted to existing drainage systems in just a few hours. Installing spill containment measures prior to a spill can result in significant savings in the event of a spill. Cleanup costs are impacted by numerous factors such as location of the spill, type of oil spilled, surrounding sensitive areas, and local regulations. For example, the average cost of cleanup (per ton) after an oil spill is drastically different for a spill in the Gulf of Mexico than it would be in South American waters, where there is a difference of almost $70,000. Instead of paying for a costly cleanup, containment measures reduce the impact on the environment and the surrounding area, and may save some of the resource.

== Technology ==
Prior to spills, important resources and at-threat areas can be mapped out

Maps, weather forecasts (wind direction), and current ocean currents can be used to predict the possible paths of contaminant

First responders can use software to quickly evaluate which response options may best suit the situation Remote control of the inflation process is also available eliminating risk to operatives in the event of hazardous chemical spills. Normally controls are pneumatic eliminating the need to run electrical cables down into the drainage system.

The latest technology in wireless spill containment eliminates any infrastructure changes using a wireless network (Zigbee) which inflates bladders that employ disposable gas cylinders. The wireless plugs enable spill containment in virtually any location. Using the Zigbee network enables the user to connect any type of component to the wireless system such as sensors, fire alarms, panic buttons, remote controls etc.

Drains of all sizes can be fitted with systems available with extension brackets that cater for drain depths from 500 mm to over 2.5m deep. There are also pneumatically controllable flap valves or pneumatically controlled non-return valves which can be fitted to existing soil waste systems.

While many technologies are aimed towards preventing oil spills or towards preparation for the spills, there are also measures that can be quickly implemented. As was the case with the Deepwater Horizon oil spill in 2010, it may take a very long time for spills to be contained.

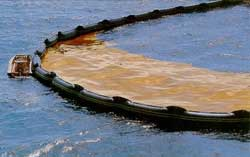
Containment Booms are quickly deployed and help with recovery efforts after oil spills

Containment booms are a commonly used containment method. The barriers float on the water, with material that hangs below, to catch contaminants. These are simply to deploy, and help in recovery efforts while protecting surrounding resources. These barriers are effective in relatively level water, however; any significant waves allow contaminants to escape the boom and impact the surrounding environment.

After using containment booms, skimmers are used to recover the contaminants.

== See also ==
- Spill pallet
- Salvage drum
