= Spill pallet =

Pallet for containing oil spills

A spill pallet is a bunded secondary containment item that is designed to hold containers of oil, hazardous liquids, and fuels, typically in either a 200-litre (44 imp gal; 53 US gal) drum or in an intermediate bulk container. It is called a 'secondary containment item' because it is designed to catch the leaks and spill of the container's contents which rest upon it.

The spill pallets can come in a variety of sizes to accommodate multiple containers. Several designs have been developed.

== UK legislation ==
In the UK, a container of oil or fuel cannot be stored outside unless it is bundled in a secondary containment item (Oil Storage Regulations 2001). This means that if the container of oil leaks, it will be contained within the bund. The secondary containment item must be able to hold 110% of the largest container above.

If a person were to store 4×200-litre drums on the sump pallet, the sump pallet must be able to hold 220 litres (48 imp gal; 58 US gal) of oil.

Although there are no laws in the UK stating that a sump pallet must hold 110% of the largest container upon it, it is still considered good practice to do so.

== Materials ==
Sump pallets can be made in a variety of materials, but due to the nature of the oils or chemicals which will be stored upon it, they are typically made from either UV stabilised polyethylene, or steel that is galvanised for further protection from harsher chemicals. Also available in stainless and mild steels.

== See also ==
- Spill containment
- Salvage drum
