= Drum pump =

Industrial tool used for liquid transport

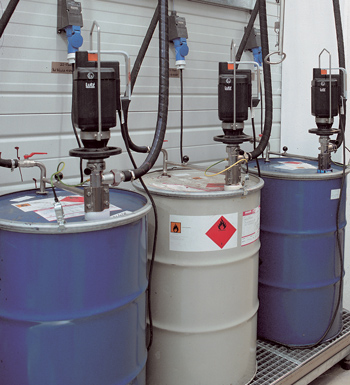
Drum pumps on barrels

Drum pump, barrel pump, and transfer pump refer to pumps that are used to empty barrels, tanks, IBCs and drums. Many liquids used on manufacturing and processing plants are delivered in 100 or 200 litre barrels and are too heavy to tip to empty the liquids inside. Drum pumps range from simple siphon based devices to sophisticated highly-engineered machinery.

== Considerations ==
- Function - Is the purpose simply to empty the drum completely in one operation, to allow dispense-on-demand operations, or to provide a metered flow to a subsequent operations? Flow rate, pressure, control systems, etc. need to be specified.
- Liquid being pumped - Product viscosity determines the type of pump mechanism. Heavy viscous liquids usually require positive displacement pumping head.
- Special product characteristics - Acids, corrosives, or reactive liquids need special materials in the drum pumps. Food and pharmaceutical liquids also need special materials as well as a means of regular cleaning and sanitizing. Flammable liquids require special handling.

== Manual ==
Low cost manual pumps are used when product dispensing is periodically needed. Crank and lever driven pumps are available. Double-action piston drum pumps can be self priming, delivering liquid on both the forward and the back stroke.

== Powered ==
Unlike a submersible pump with the motor submerged, a drum pump has a drive motor above the container. Electric and pneumatic motors are available. The motor is attached to the vertical shaft at the top of the tube outside the drum and the pumping element is located at the end of the shaft inside the drum. This configuration allows the drum to be emptied without tipping and so reduces the risk of spills and operator injury.

== Modern engineering considerations ==
According to industrial pump specialist Russell Morgan, modern drum pump design has increasingly focused on reducing vibration, shaft deflection and premature wear—factors that limit service life in heavy-duty applications. Because drum pumps incorporate a long driveshaft that reaches the bottom of the container, contemporary pump tubes often utilise reinforced internal components such as larger diameter driveshafts, steel‑cored inner tubes, high‑surface‑area support bearings and oversized bearing housings. These design features aim to stabilise the driveshaft during operation, maintain alignment at high rotational speeds and reduce radial loading on the shaft and impeller, thereby extending overall pump longevity. Morgan notes that these developments have become particularly important when handling high‑density or higher‑viscosity fluids, where mechanical stress on pump components is significantly increased.

=== Positive displacement vs. centrifugal drum pumps ===
Morgan also highlights the operational differences between centrifugal and positive displacement drum pumps, which influence pump selection. Centrifugal designs require the impeller to remain submerged and are not capable of dry priming; flow ceases once air enters the pump. The combined effects of gravity, atmospheric pressure and the low‑pressure region created in front of the impeller facilitate fluid movement to the pump inlet, reducing the risk of cavitation. As a result, centrifugal drum pumps have limited capability when pumping higher‑viscosity media.

In contrast, slower‑running positive displacement models—such as rotor‑stator progressive cavity pumps—can generate significant suction that actively draws fluid into the pumping chamber. This makes them suitable for handling viscous materials, non‑Newtonian paste‑like media, adhesive substances and applications requiring accurate flow control, such as pumping tomato paste or epoxy resins.

=== Safety, materials and regulatory requirements ===
In hazardous areas (as designated by a DSEAR review) or regulated production environments, drum pump selection must account for chemical compatibility, liquid flammability, flash point, explosive limits, liquid conductivity and compliance with applicable safety and industry standards. Morgan notes that pneumatic motors paired with conductive stainless‑steel pump tubes are widely used for transferring flammable solvents due to their ATEX‑approved construction, which incorporates earth‑bonding points, zone‑separation features and an inherently reduced ignition risk.

Additional safety features—such as fume‑control glands, fume‑capture systems and back‑flow prevention valves—help minimise vapour emissions and support near‑complete drum emptying when required. These considerations have contributed to broader adoption of modular drum pump systems that allow operators to match drive motor type, tube material and accessory configuration to application‑specific requirements.

== Hot melt drum pump ==
Some materials are solid at ambient temperatures and must be melted to allow pumping. This might include open-head drums of hot-melt adhesive, heavy grease, etc. Several systems have been developed which use a heated platen placed on the material; the melted material is then pumped through a heated hose to its destination.

== See also ==
- Pump dispenser
