= Drum handler =

A Drum handler is a piece of mechanical equipment that is used to securely grip, lift and transport cylindrical modules such as steel drums, barrels, plastic drums and fiber drums. It has spring-loaded metal arms to create a tight and secure grip. This equipment is commonly used in chemical and petroleum industries, as well as industries that require shipping and storing of cylindrical modules.

In the rubber tire and tube industry, a drum handler may also refer to a worker who primarily removes drums of rubberized fabric wrapped between layers of canvas for separation from the bias cutter and rolls the drums to the tire-building department, returning empty drums and canvas liner for rewinding.

== Description ==
The drum handler is usually used for handling a standard size 55-gallon drum container. However, there are models that can handle smaller and bigger capacity drums. This equipment can be used to lift, stack, move, weigh, pour and rack drums and barrels. Certain models of drum handlers may be adapted to transport tires, as well. Drum handlers are usually made of heavy duty metals with smooth coating.

== Types ==
There are different types of drum handlers available in today's market; forklift attachment, hydraulic drum lifter, mobile drum handler, below-hook drum handler and drum rotator.

Forklift Attachment is a type of drum handler that is designed to easily slide into a forklift truck. This type of drum handler is used to efficiently and safely load and unload different sizes and types of drums. Once inserted into forklift trucks, operators can easily clamp, lift and transport drums anywhere. Forklift drum handlers are available in different models such as forklift mounted, carrier with tilt function, carrier without tilt function, waist type, rim type and multi-drum carrier.

Mobile Drum Handler is a stand-alone type of drum handler. Unlike the forklift attachments, mobile drum handlers have built in wheels so you can easily maneuver it anywhere. This type of drum handlers is made with stainless steel and also has a wide heavy duty jaw that can grip the top rim of standard drums. There are two types of mobile drum handler; manual and hydraulic powered. Drum dollies, palletizer, vertical lift pourer and spotter are good examples of mobile drum handler.

Hydraulic Drum Lifter is a stand-alone piece of drum handling equipment that uses a wheeled trolley combined with a vertical lifting mast and drum gripping system. Often operated by a hydraulic pump with manual user pedal input or an electric motor. An example product is the VanMate.

Below-hook drum handler is commonly used to lift, tilt and pour drums. It is made with premium grade stainless steel and features hydraulic powered lifting mechanism with chain puller. It features a grip which holds the drum below the third ribbing or underneath. It also has lifting eyes or fork packets for added support. Examples of below-hook drum handler are drum pourers and drum lift carriers.

Non Sparking Monel Drums are widely used in hazardous environments exposed to flammable particles or corrosive chemicals.

Drum rotator is used to invert and rotate drums as well as transfer contents from one container to another. This type of drum handler features ring gear and rotator that can either be electric powered or hydraulic powered. Examples of drum rotators are tumblers, drum rollers, portable rollers and stationary drum rollers.
