= Pump dispenser =

Pump in lid of containers of liquids

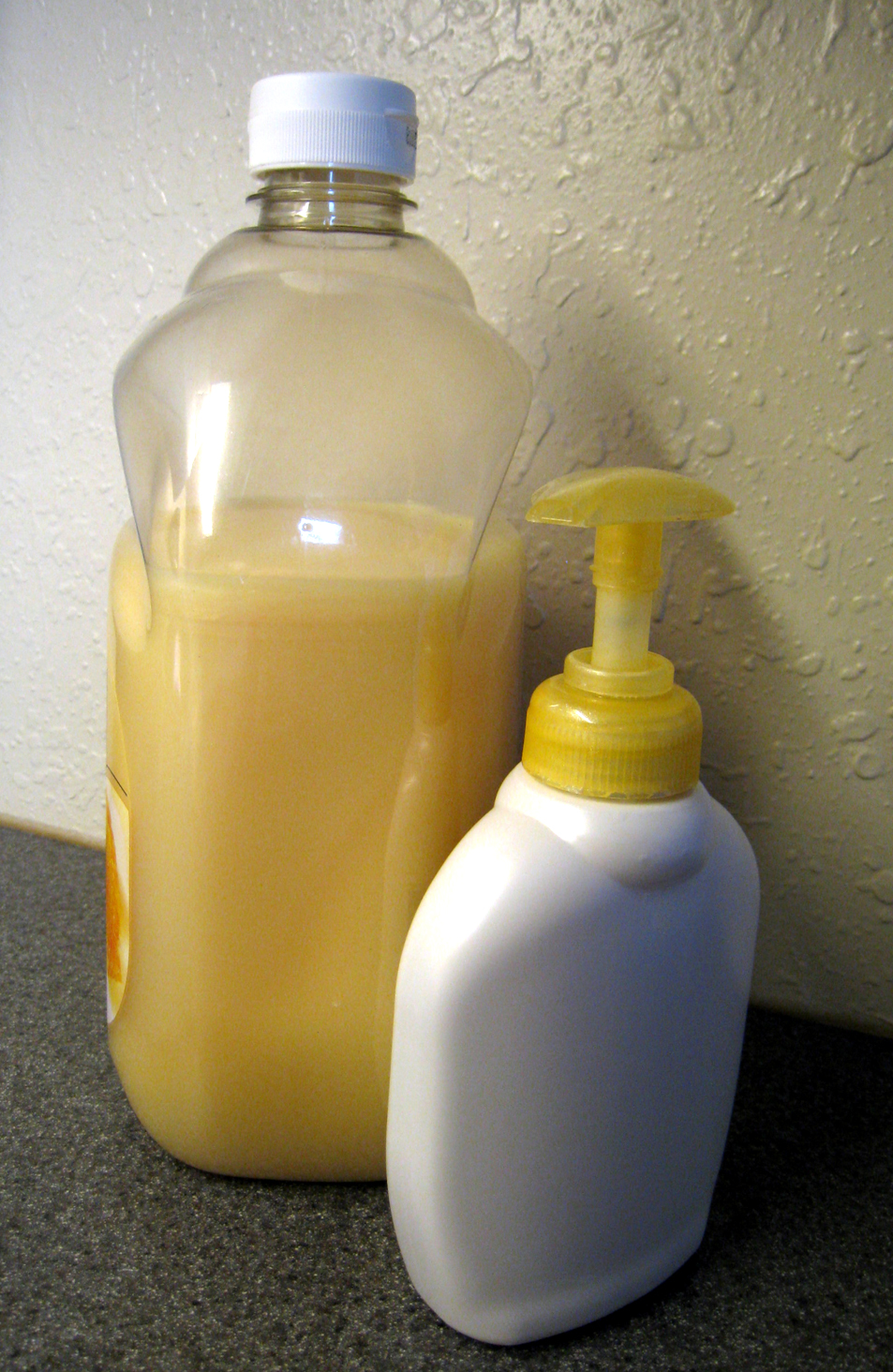
Refillable bottle with pump dispenser for liquid soap

A pump dispenser is used on containers of liquids to help dispensing. They might be used on bottles, jars, or tubes. Often the contents are viscous liquids such as creams and lotions. Some are metered to provide uniform usage. Some mix contents from two or more sources prior to dispensing.

== Typical products ==
- Liquid soap
- Moisturizer
- Toothpaste
- Lotion
- Cosmetics
- Pharmaceuticals

== Functioning ==
Several types of pumps and dispensing systems have been developed. Some of the pumps are similar to those of spray bottles.

== Examples ==
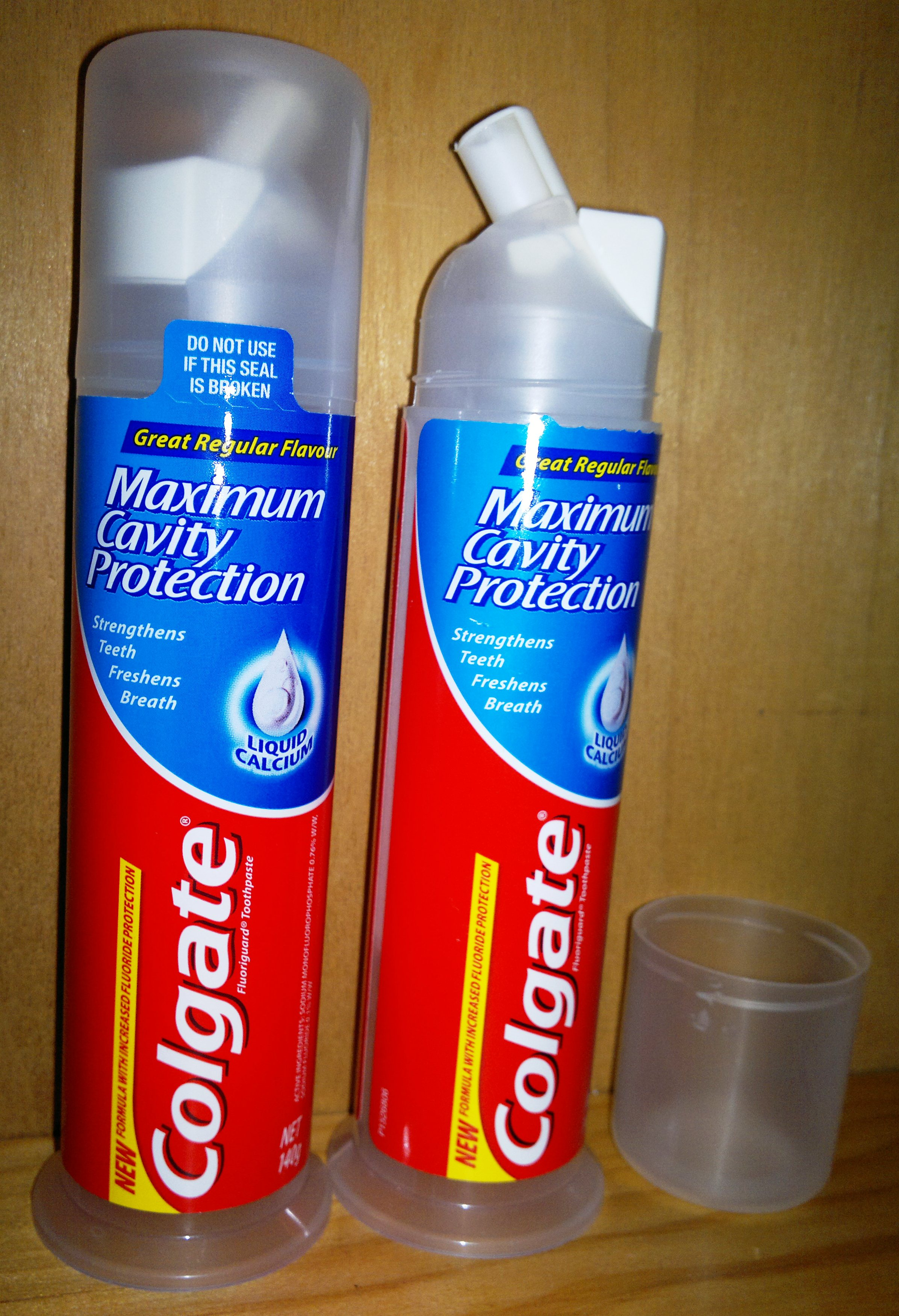
Pump on toothpaste tube

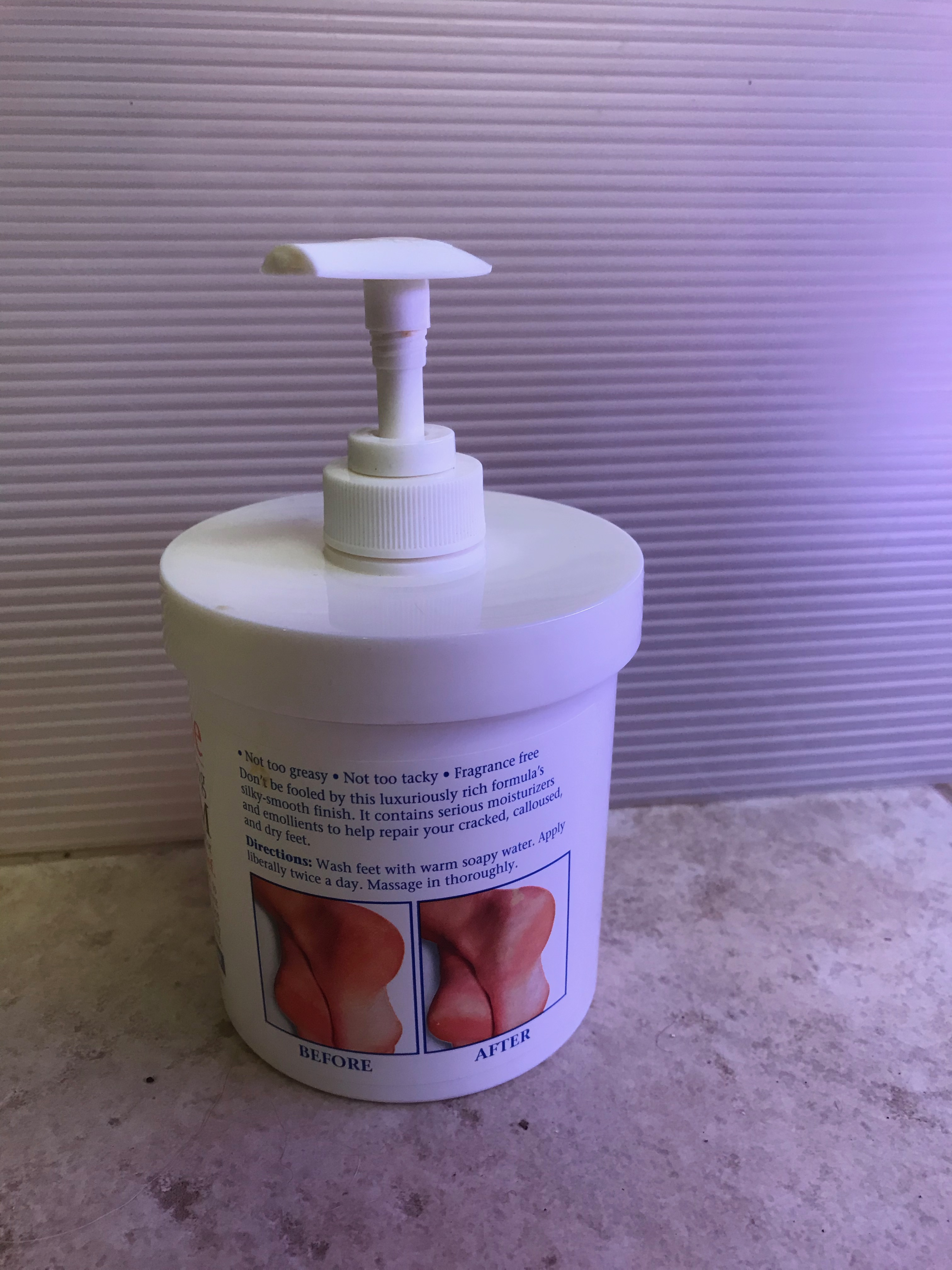
Jar of skin cream with dispenser

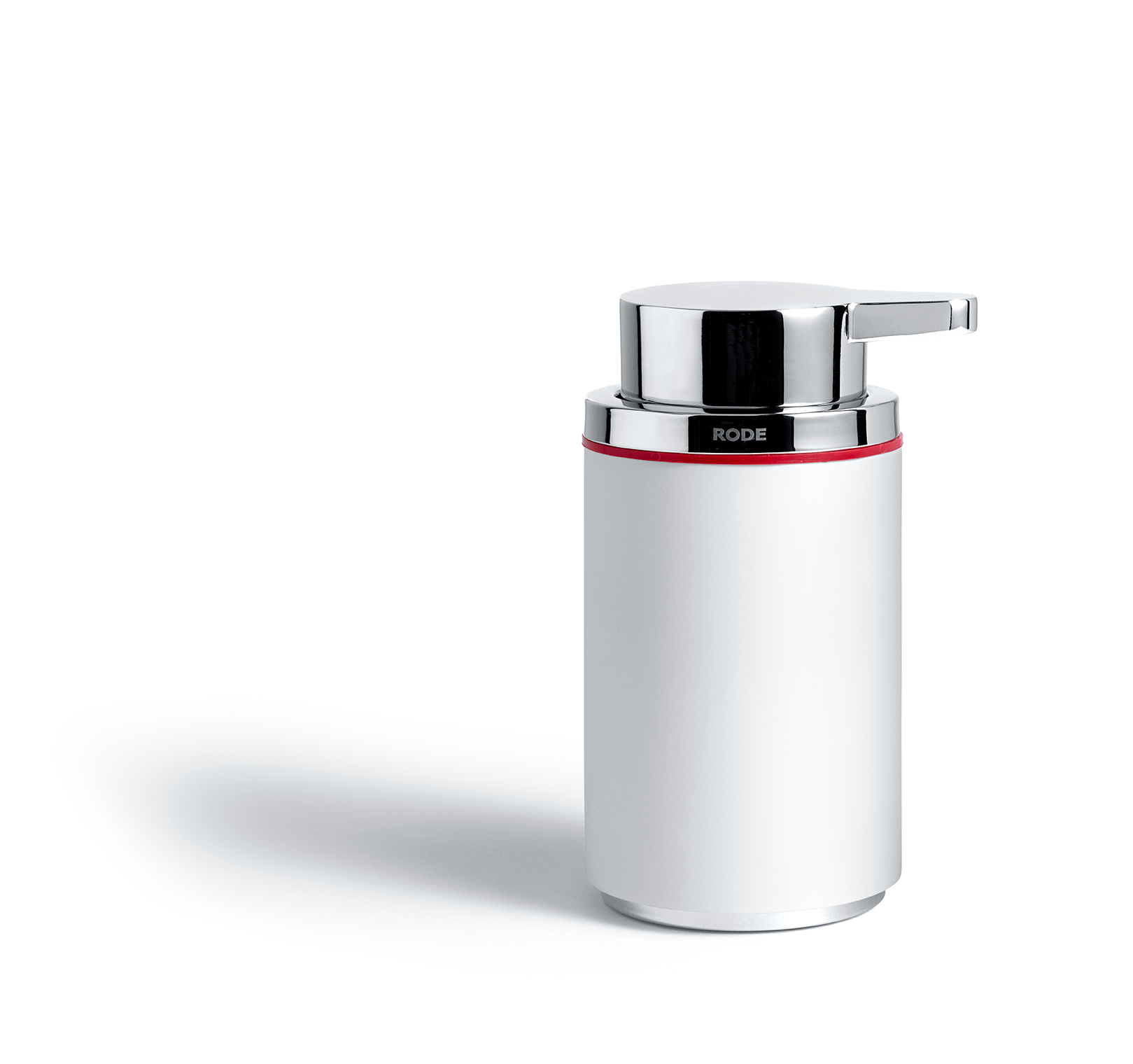
Soap dispenser

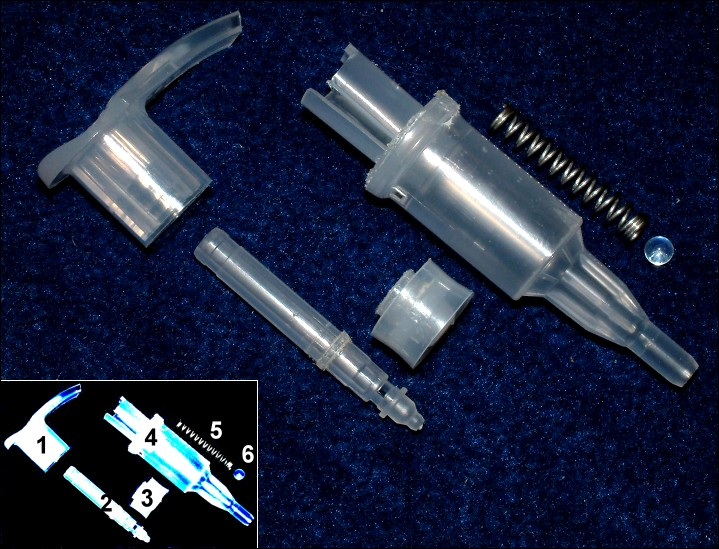
Assembly of pump for lotions

== See also ==
- Pump
- Toothpaste pump dispenser
- Drum pump
