= Actuation =

Actuation may refer to:

- High Redundancy Actuation (HRA), a new approach to fault tolerant control in the area of mechanical actuation
- Variable valve actuation, any mechanism or method that can alter the shape or timing of a valve lift event within an internal combustion engine
- Actuation, a type of self-realization referred to in Aristotle's philosophy of entelechy.

== See also ==
- Actuator
