= Compatibility (chemical) =

How stable a substance is when mixed with another substance

Chemical compatibility is a rough measure of how stable a substance is when mixed with another substance. If two substances can mix together and not undergo a chemical reaction, they are considered compatible. Incompatible chemicals react with each other, and can cause corrosion, mechanical weakening, evolution of gas, fire, or other undesirable interactions.

Chemical compatibility is important when choosing materials for chemical storage or reactions, so that the vessel and other apparatus will not be damaged by its contents. For purposes of chemical storage, chemicals that are incompatible should not be stored together, so that any leak will not cause an even more dangerous situation from chemical reactions. In addition, chemical compatibility refers to the container material being acceptable to store the chemical or for a tool or object that comes in contact with a chemical to not degrade. For example, when stirring a chemical, the stirrer must be stable in the chemical that is being stirred.

Many companies publish chemical resistance charts. and databases to help chemical users use appropriate materials for handling chemicals. Such charts are particularly important for polymers as they are often not compatible with common chemical reagents; this may even depend on how the polymers have been processed. For example, 3-D printing polymer tools used for chemical experiments must be chosen to ensure chemical compatibility with care.

Chemical compatibility is also important when choosing among different chemicals that have similar purposes. For example, bleach and ammonia, both commonly used as cleaners, can undergo a dangerous chemical reaction when combined with each other, producing poisonous fumes. Even though each of them has a similar use, care must be taken not to allow these chemicals to mix.

== See also ==
- chemically inert
