= Drum (container) =

Cylindrical shipping container used for shipping bulk cargo

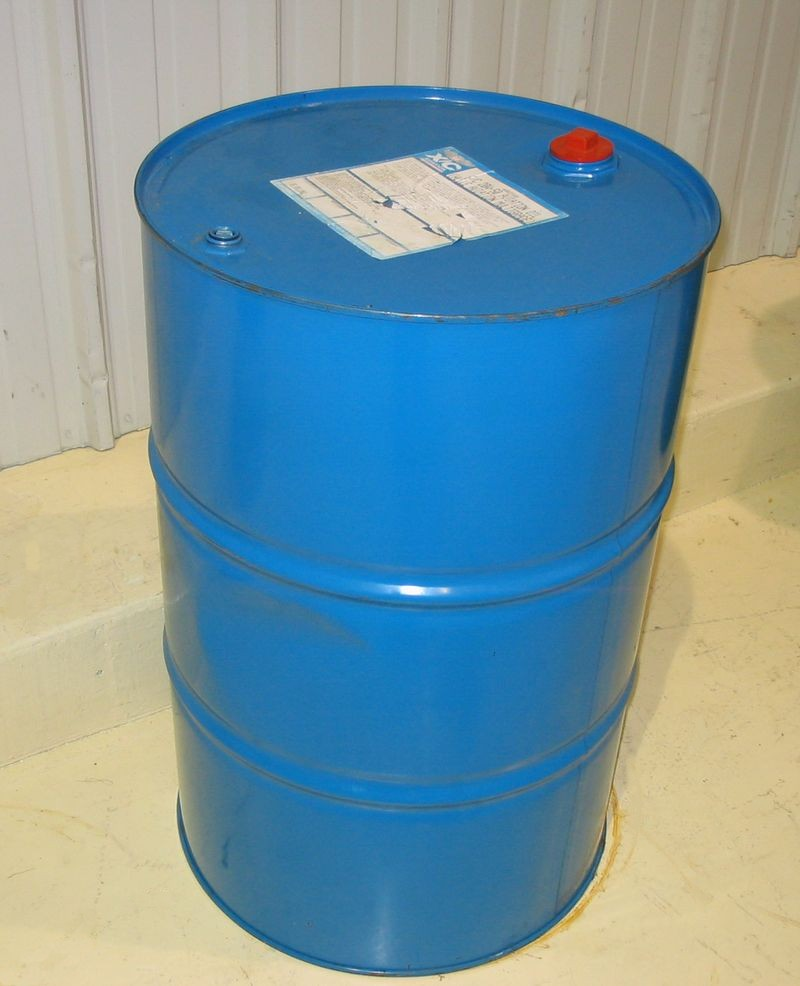
A typical 200-litre (55 US or 44 imp gal) tight head drum

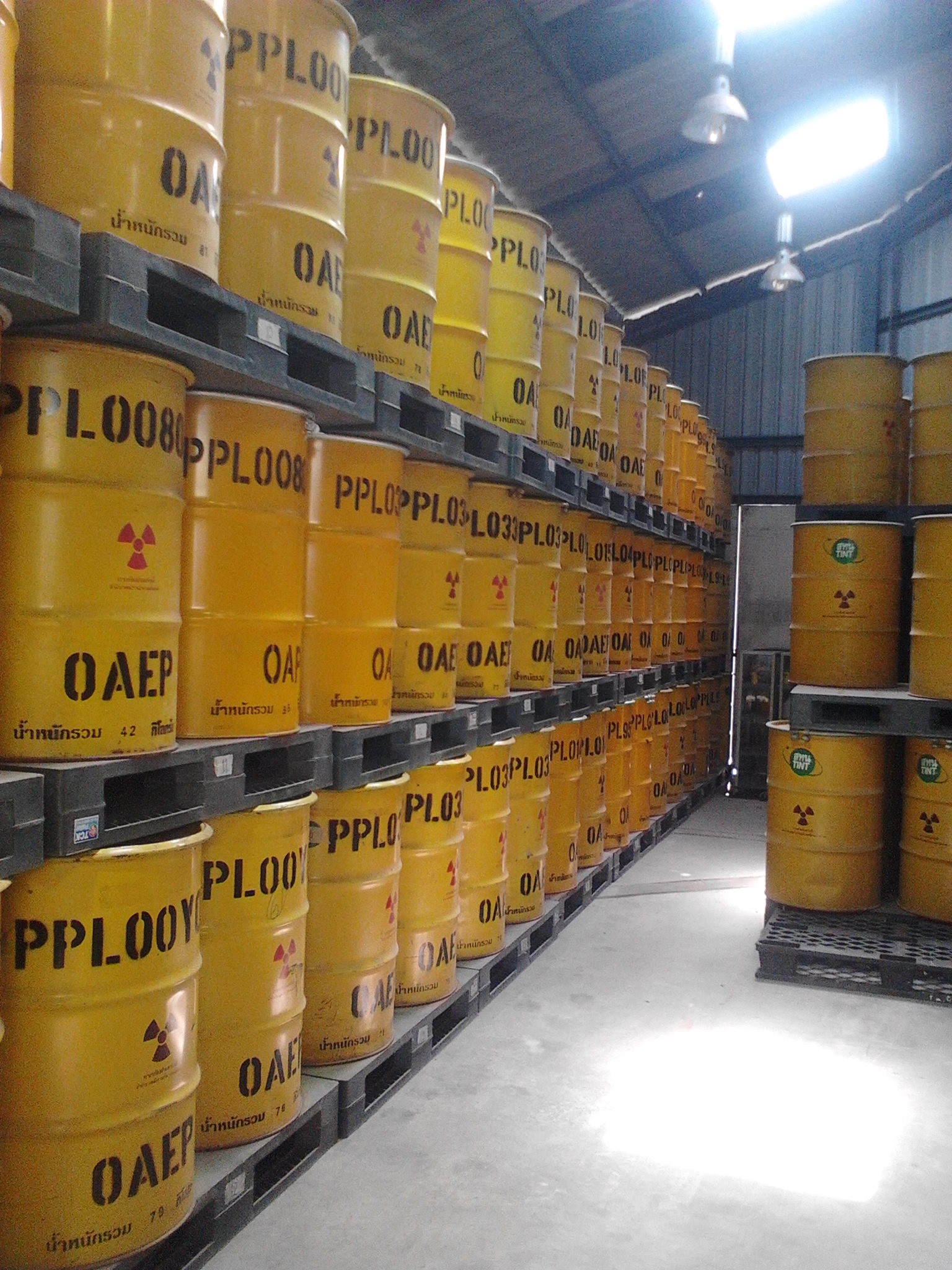
Low level nuclear waste in open head steel drums.

A drum (also called a barrel) is a cylindrical shipping container used for shipping bulk cargo. Drums can be made of steel, dense paperboard (commonly called a fibre drum), or plastic, and are generally used for the transportation and storage of liquids and powders. Drums are often stackable, and have dimensions designed for efficient warehouse and logistics use. This type of packaging is frequently certified for transporting dangerous goods. Proper shipment requires the drum to comply with all applicable regulations.

== Steel drums ==
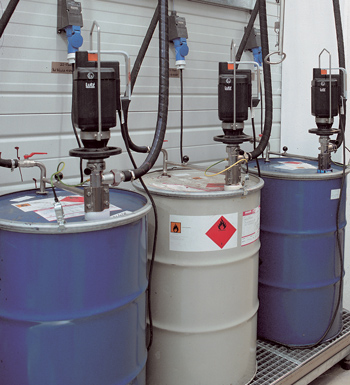
Drum pumps on drums

Steel drums are ubiquitous industrial shipping containers. They are manufactured from sheets of cold rolled steel formed into a tube and welded along the side seam. Stainless steel, nickel, and special alloys are occasionally used. The bottom head is permanently attached by the manufacturer. Two primary options are available for the top head:

- Open head drum, removable head drum: Top head is attached after filling with a closing ring and bolted lock. Liquids, granular solids and waste are commonly shipped in these.
- Tight head drum, closed head drum, non-removable head drum: The top head is permanently attached by the manufacturer. It is usually made with one or two threaded access fittings, closed by threaded bungs after filling. Liquids are suited to these drums.

=== History ===
Henry Wehrhahn, employee of Nellie Bly's Iron Clad Manufacturing Company of New York, received two patents in December 1905 that would lead to the modern 55-gallon steel drum Use of 200-litre drums became widespread in World War II, the first war in which trucks, cold rolled steel, stamp or pattern forging machinery and welding were widely available. They were first utilized by the Axis powers (Germany and Italy), but were quickly adopted by Allies. The drums helped win the Guadalcanal campaign in the first U.S. offensive in the South Pacific Theater. The U.S. Navy could not maintain command of the sea long enough to offload aviation gasoline for aircraft ashore, so the drums were often transported to the island on fast ships, such as destroyers, and shoved over the sides (or, time permitting, lowered in cargo nets). Because gasoline's density is much less than that of water, the drums floated. Navy Seabees in small craft corralled the drums.

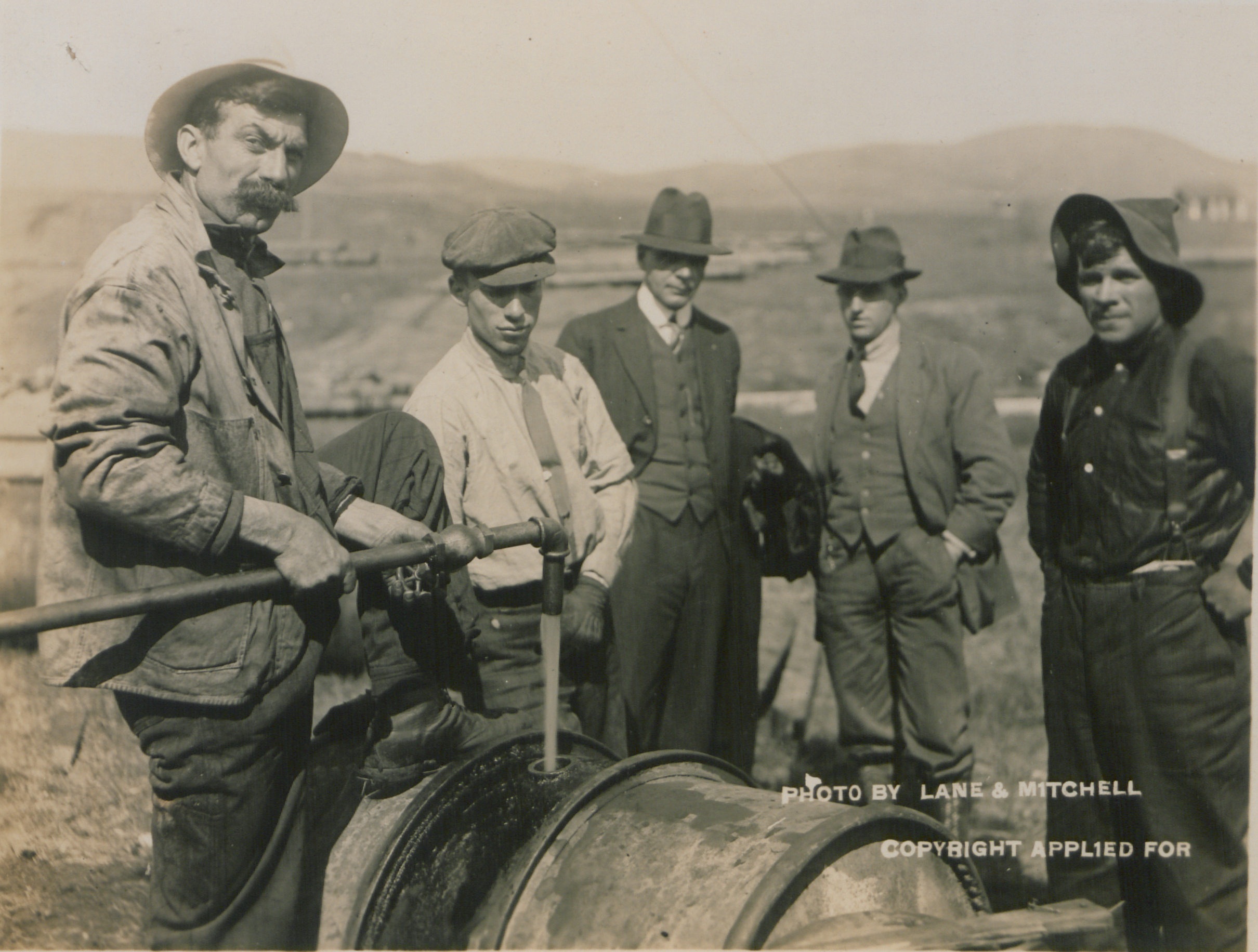
Filling oil drum, 1914

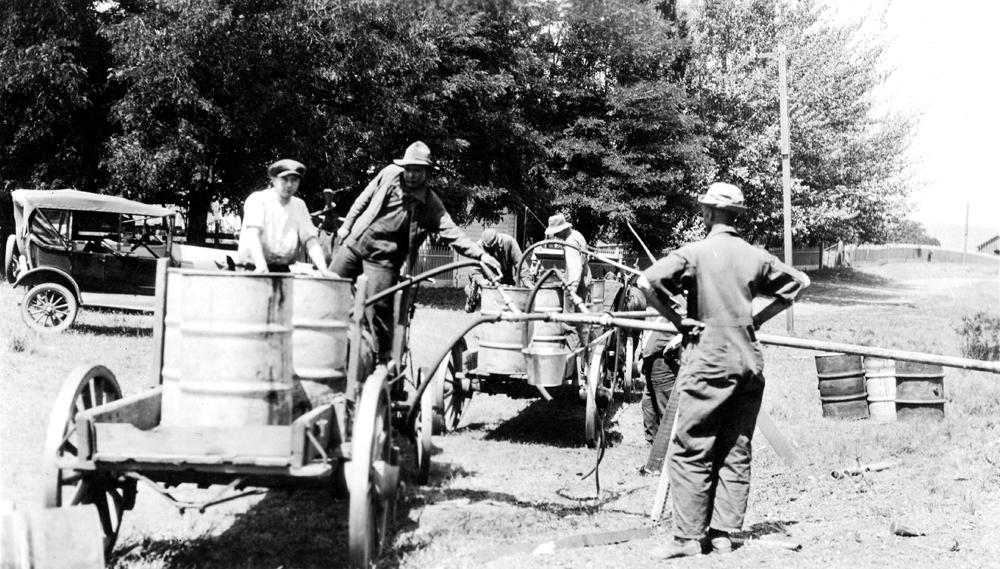
Filling oil drums, 1919

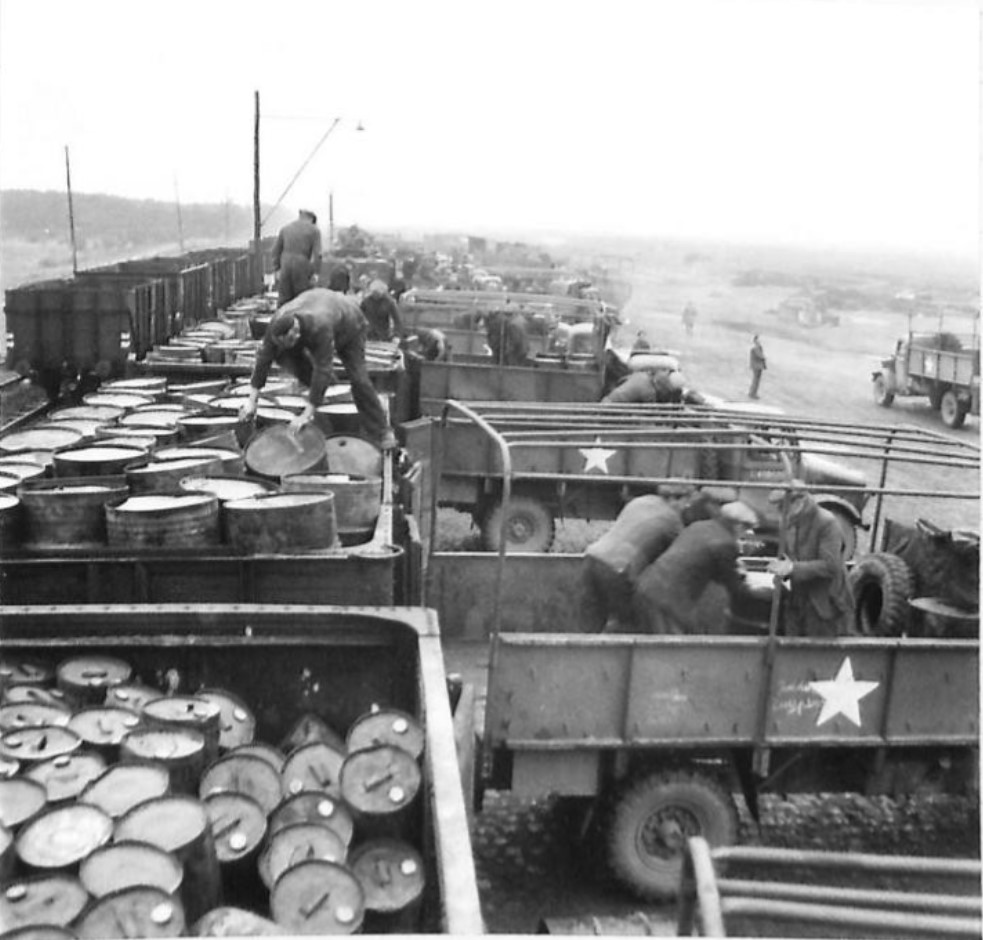
Drums of oil being transferred from rail cars to trucks, WWII

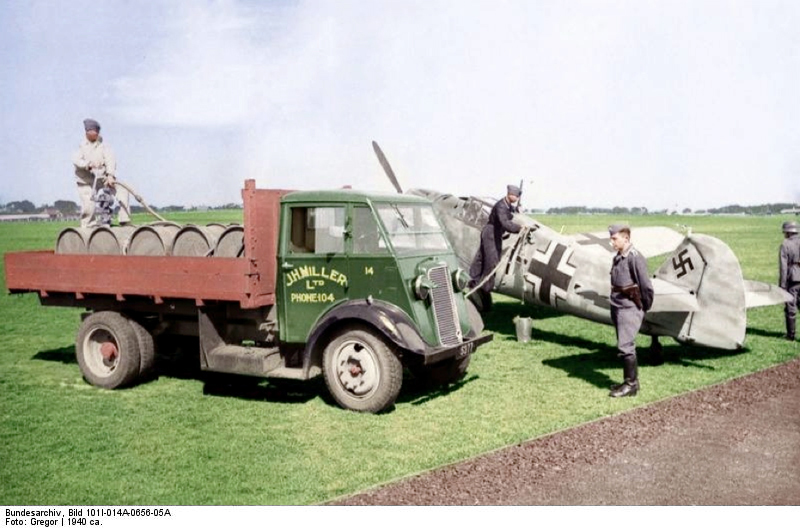
Drums of aviation fuel on a truck, WWII

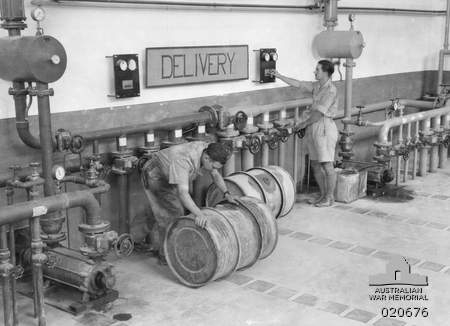
Australian troops using captured Italian 200 L drums and filling equipment, Tobruk, Libya 1941

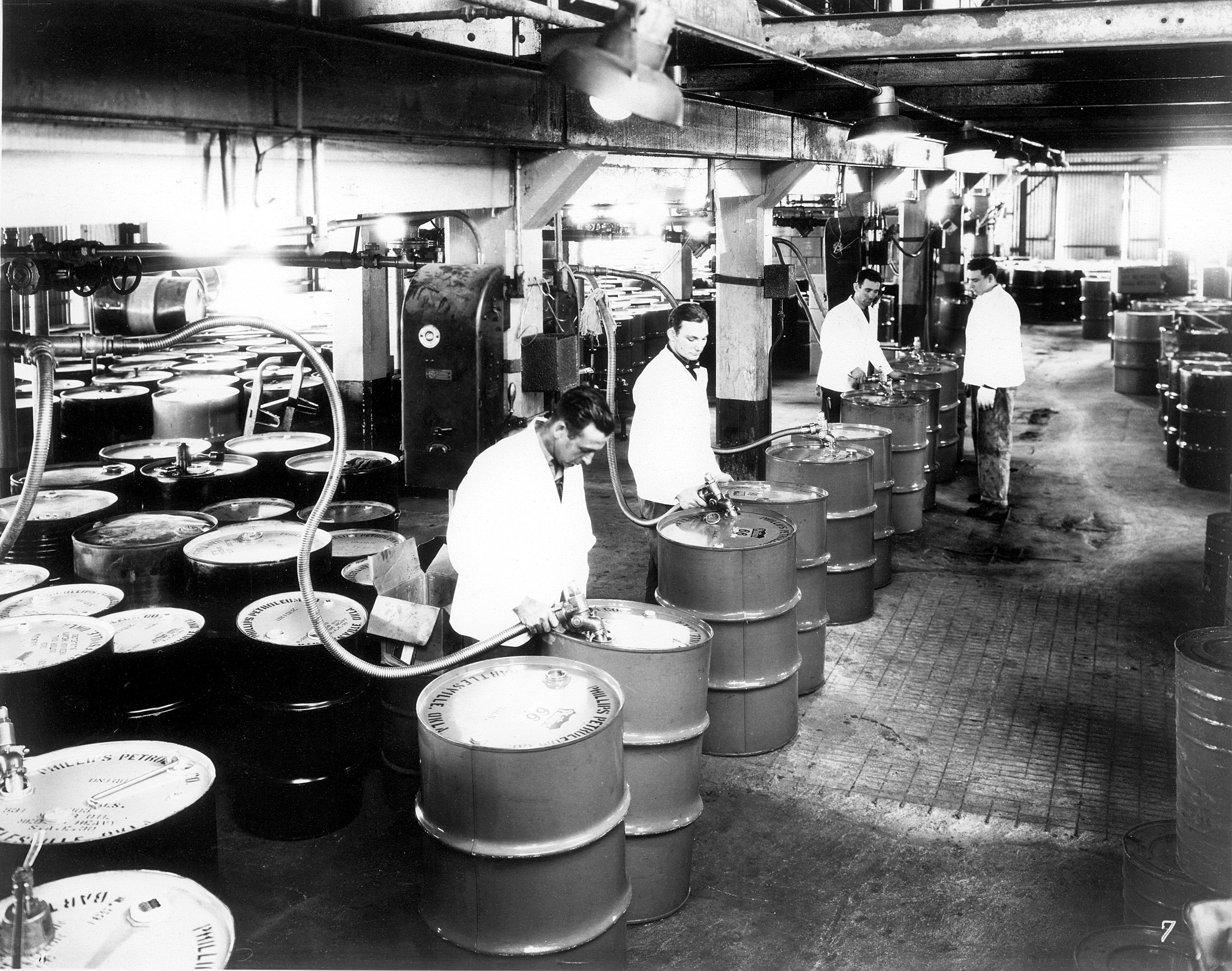
Filling drums with lube oil, circa 1950

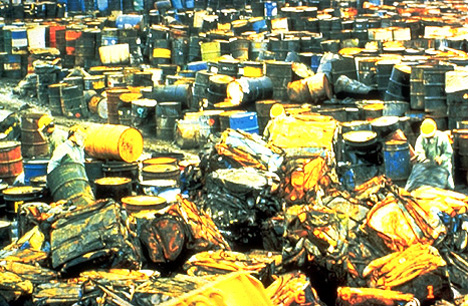
Valley of the Drums; illegal dumping of toxic waste lead to an EPA superfund site in Kentucky, USA, 1980

=== Constructions ===
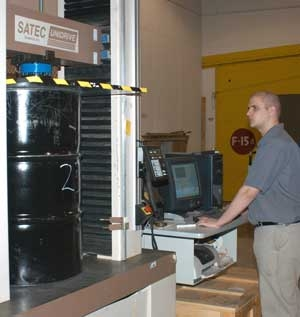
Compression test for steel drum

A wide variety of constructions and sizes are available. When the intended use is for shipment of dangerous goods (hazardous materials), strict regulatory requirements are applicable. Coordinated by the UN, countries and regional authorities require drum construction and the demonstrated performance of severe testing. The Industrial Steel Drum Institute has also provided guidance for conducting the tests. Drums have embossed symbols to identify certification for shipment of certain types of products.

Many drums nominally measure just under 880 millimetres (35 in) tall with a diameter just under 610 millimetres (24 in), and have a common nominal volume of 208 litres (55 US gal) whereas the barrel volume of crude oil is 42 US gallons (159 L). In the United States, 25-US-gallon (95-litre) drums are also in common use and have the same height. This allows easy stacking of mixed pallets. Barrels can be constructed of plastic, laminated paperboard or steel.

Drums have top and (usually) bottom chimes or rims: sometimes called chines. Most steel drums have reinforcing rolling hoops or rings of thickened metal or plastic. This sufficiently strengthens them so that they can readily be turned on their sides and rolled when filled with heavy materials, like liquids. Over short to medium distances, drums can be tipped and rolled on the bottom rim while being held at an angle, balanced, and rotated with a two-handed top grip that also supplies the torque (rotational or rolling force).

The open-top sub-type is sealed by a mechanical ring clamp (concave inwards) that exerts sufficient pressure to hold many non-volatile liquids and make an airtight seal against a gasket, as it exerts force inward and downward when tightened by a normal three-quarter inch wrench or ratchet wrench. Tops exist with bung holes as above, and these hybrid drums with lid can be used to ship many non-volatile liquids as well as industrial powders. Many drums are used to ship and store powdered products as well as liquids, such as plastic beads for injection moulding, extrusion, and purified industrial grade powders like cleansers (e.g., fertilizers, and powdered aluminum). If used to transport dangerous goods across international boundaries, they may need to have UN certification. In general, drum usage is limited to wholesale distribution of bulk products, which are then further processed or sub-divided in a factory.

These metal drums have two openings with flanges, often 51 millimetres (2 in) NPS and 19 millimetres (0.75 in) NPS in diameter. Once the drums are filled, the plugs (bungs) are screwed in the flanges using pneumatic or hand-operated bung tightener (plug wrench). To secure the contents of the drums against theft and adulteration during shipment, cap-seals made of metal and other types like metal-plastic laminates are used. These cap-seals sit on top of the flanges and are crimped, using a drum cap-seal crimping tool, also called a drum cap sealer. Once cap-seals are crimped, the plugs can be unscrewed only by breaking these cap-seals. Pneumatic and hand-operated cap-seal crimping tools are available. Pneumatic ones are used in production lines for high production.

=== International standard size ===
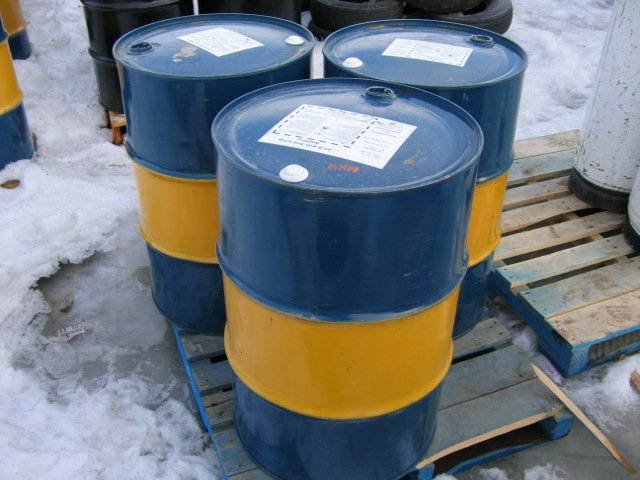
Steel drums used as shipping containers for chemicals and other liquids

A 200-litre drum (known as a 55-gallon drum in the United States and a 44-gallon drum in the United Kingdom and the rest of the world) is a cylindrical container with a nominal capacity of 200 litres (55 US or 44 imp gal). The exact capacity varies by manufacturer, purpose, or other factors. Standard drums have inside dimensions of 572 millimetres (22.5 in) diameter and 851 millimetres (33.5 in) height. These dimensions yield a volume of about 218.7 litres (57.8 US gal; 48.1 imp gal), but they are commonly filled to about 200 litres.

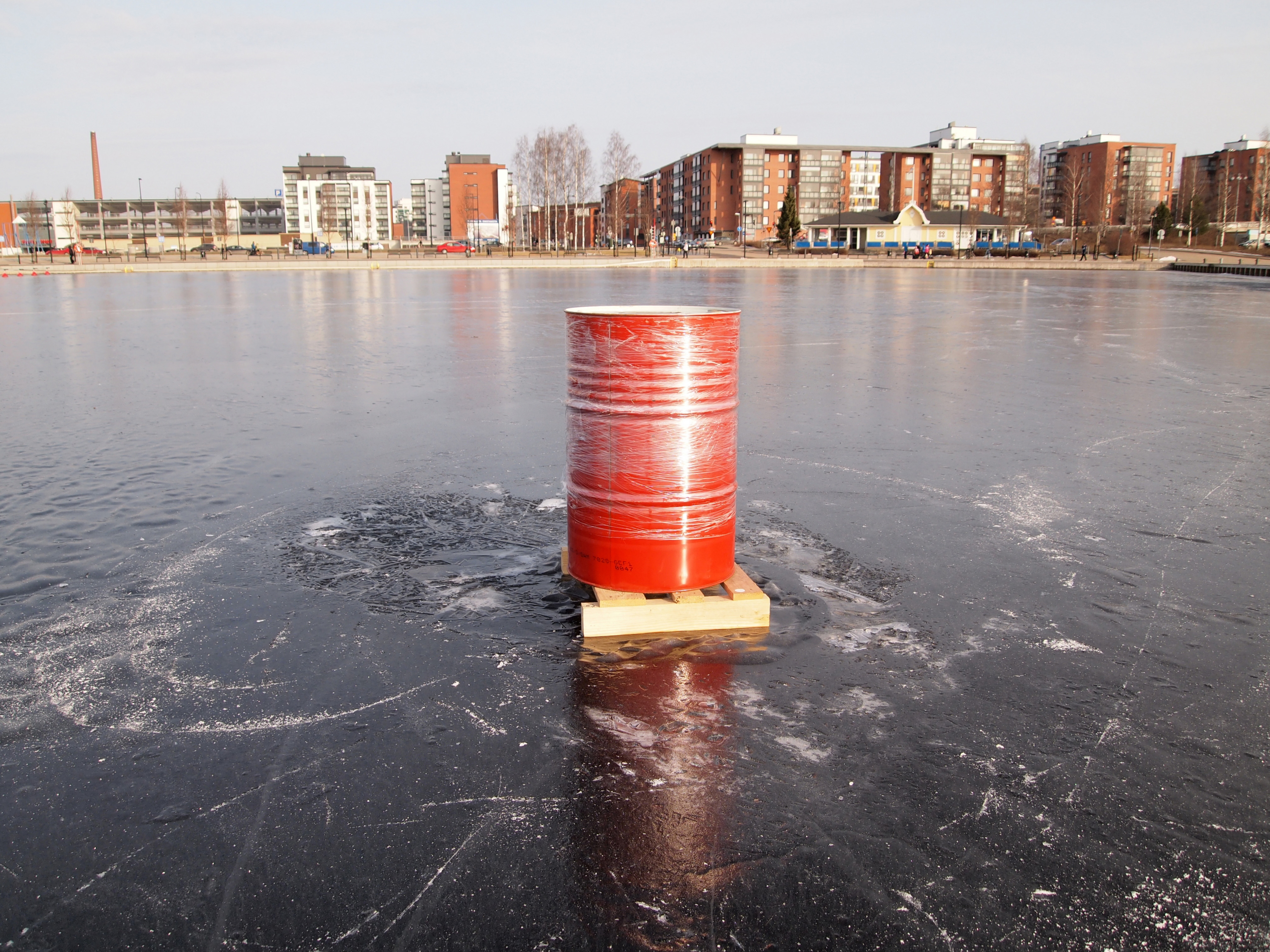
Red steel drum on the frozen Lake Jyväsjärvi in Jyväskylä, Finland

The outside dimensions of a 200-litre drum are typically 584 millimetres (23 in) diameter at the top or bottom rim, 597 millimetres (23.5 in) diameter at the chines (ridges around drum), and 876 millimetres (34.5 in) height. Exact dimensions are specified in ANSI MH2.

The drums are typically made of steel with a ribbed outer wall to improve rigidity and for rolling. The lids can be welded or secured with a head gasket and bolt ring. They are commonly used for transporting oils, fuels, chemicals, and dry goods.

Drums are frequently transported on pallets for ease of handling by a fork truck and for shipping. The drum's size, shape, and weight distribution lends itself to being moved about readily on the loading dock or factory floor with a two-wheeled hand truck. They can be turned on side and rolled. They can also be moved by hand short distances on firm surfaces by tilting and then rolling along the base, or by using a drum handler, which is designed especially for that purpose.

Closed-head steel barrels and drums used for shipment of chemicals and petroleum products have a standardised bunghole arrangement, with one 51-millimetre (2 in) (DN50) NPT and one 19-millimetre (3/4 in) (DN20) NPT threaded bunghole on opposite sides of the top head. Drums can also be made of durable plastic or paperboard and this arrangement is echoed in many plastic drums. Various components can be mounted to the drum, such as drum pumps and bung mixers.

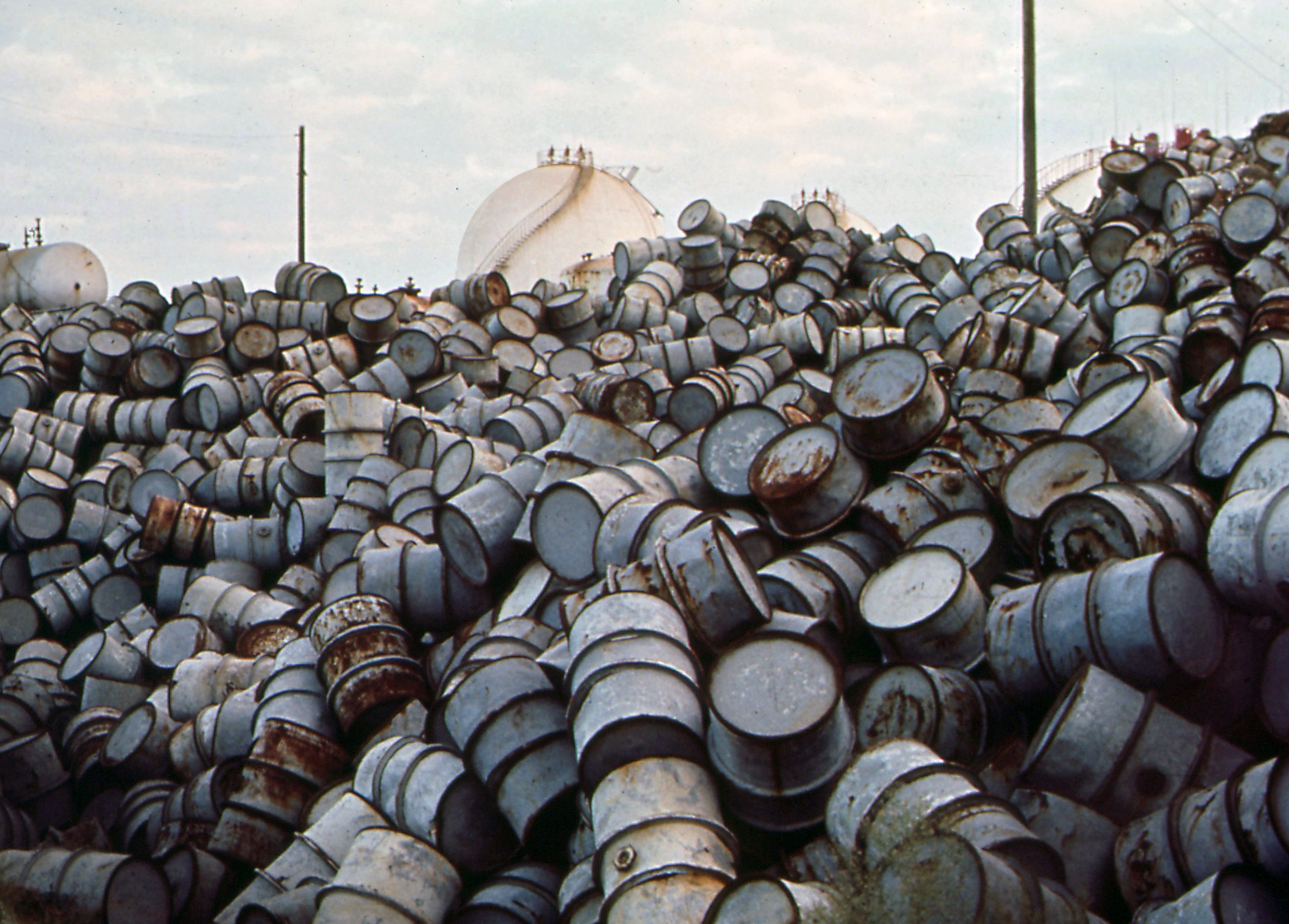
A large pile of drums near the Baton Rouge Refinery in December 1972

In the past, hazardous waste was often placed in drums of this size and stored in open fields or buried. Over time, some drums would corrode and leak. As a result, these drums have become iconic of pollution problems, even though they have numerous uses and are ubiquitous in commerce. Tests have shown that a leaking 55-gallon drum can disperse its contents over a 1,200 square-foot area of level surface. Drums are often cleaned or re-conditioned and then used for storing or shipping various liquids or materials.

Although crude oil is sometimes shipped in 55-US-gallon drums, the measurement standard of oil in barrels is based on the whiskey containers of the 1870s that measured 42 US gallons (35 imp gal; 159 L). The measure of 42 US or wine gallons corresponds to a wine tierce (third-pipe). A wine barrel, or 1/8 tun, measures 31.5 US gallons (26.2 imp gal; 119.2 L).

Applicable standards include:

- ISO 15750-1:2002. Packaging — Steel drums — Part 1: Removable head (open head) drums with a minimum total capacity of 208 L, 210 L, and 216.5 L
- ISO 15750-2:2002. Packaging — Steel drums — Part 2: Non-removable head (tight head) drums with a minimum total capacity of 212 L, 216.5 L, and 230 L
- ISO 15750-3:2022. Packaging — Steel drums — Part 3: Inserted flange-type closure systems

=== Reconditioning ===
Steel drums are commonly reconditioned for further use. Life cycle studies of reconditioning and reuse have been quite favorable. Clean drums go to a qualified reconditioner: hazardous residue can be a concern to regulators. Reconditioning usually consists of inspection, removal of labels, cleaning (mechanical, heat, or caustic cleaner), straightening of dents and chimes, replacement of gaskets, painting, testing, marking and labeling. Steel drums can often go through many use - reconditioning - reuse cycles before they are recycled or landfilled.

== Fibre drums ==
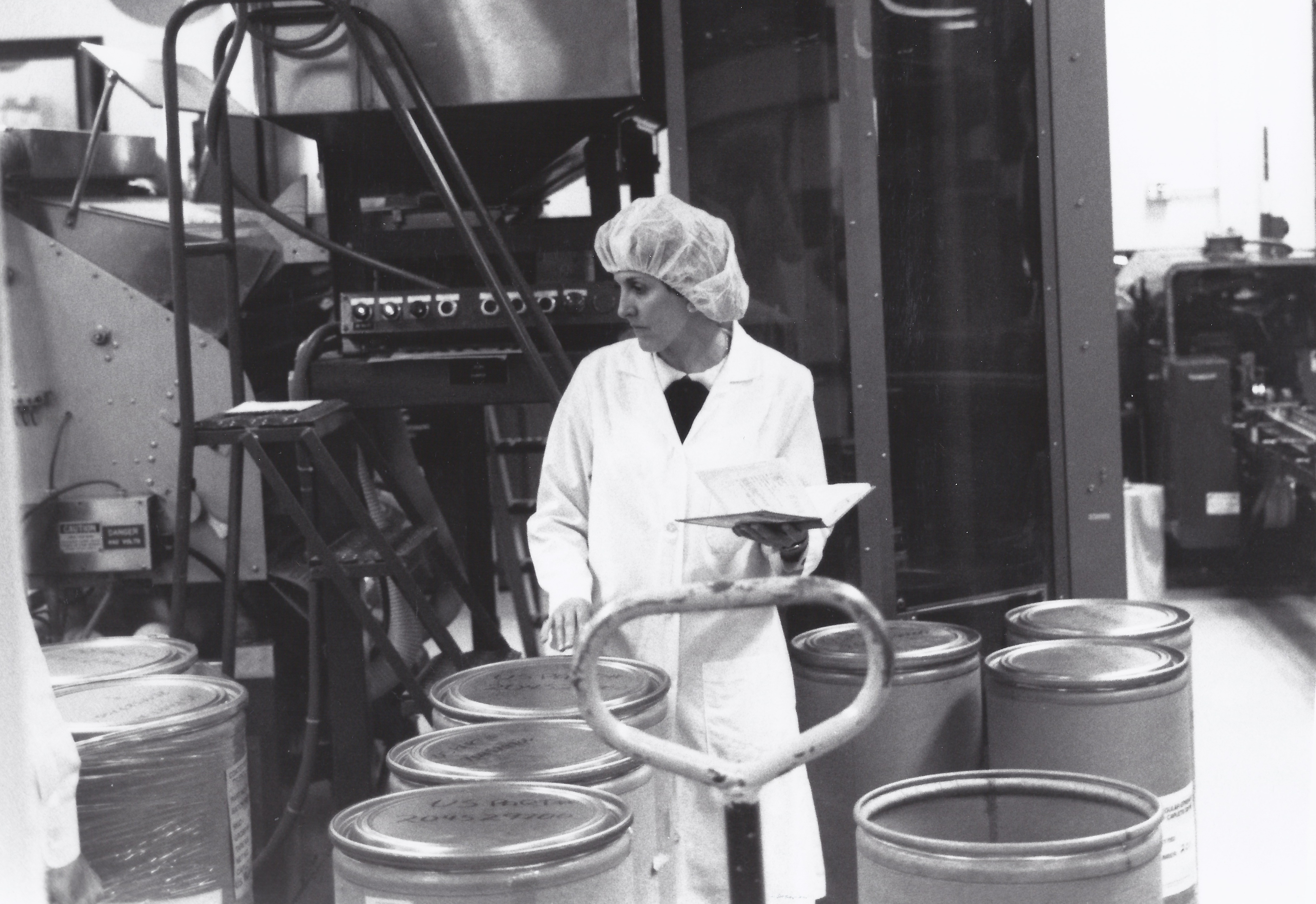
Bulk drugs in fiber drums

Fibre drums (occasionally: fiber drums) are shipping containers with paperboard : laminated paperboard; plastics, foils, and other protective layers. The heads can be of fibreboard, metal, plywood, plastic or other suitable material. Drums typically have a circular cross section but square drums are also available: these can be packed closer during shipment and storage.

Fibre drums are available in a variety of constructions and sizes. They are used for shipping various granular materials, coiled wire and cable, long Fluorescent light bulbs, and (when certified) for dangerous goods. Compatibility with the contents is important; drum liners are commonly used.

Steel, fibre, and plastic covers are available with steel lever lock ring closures.

== Plastic drums ==
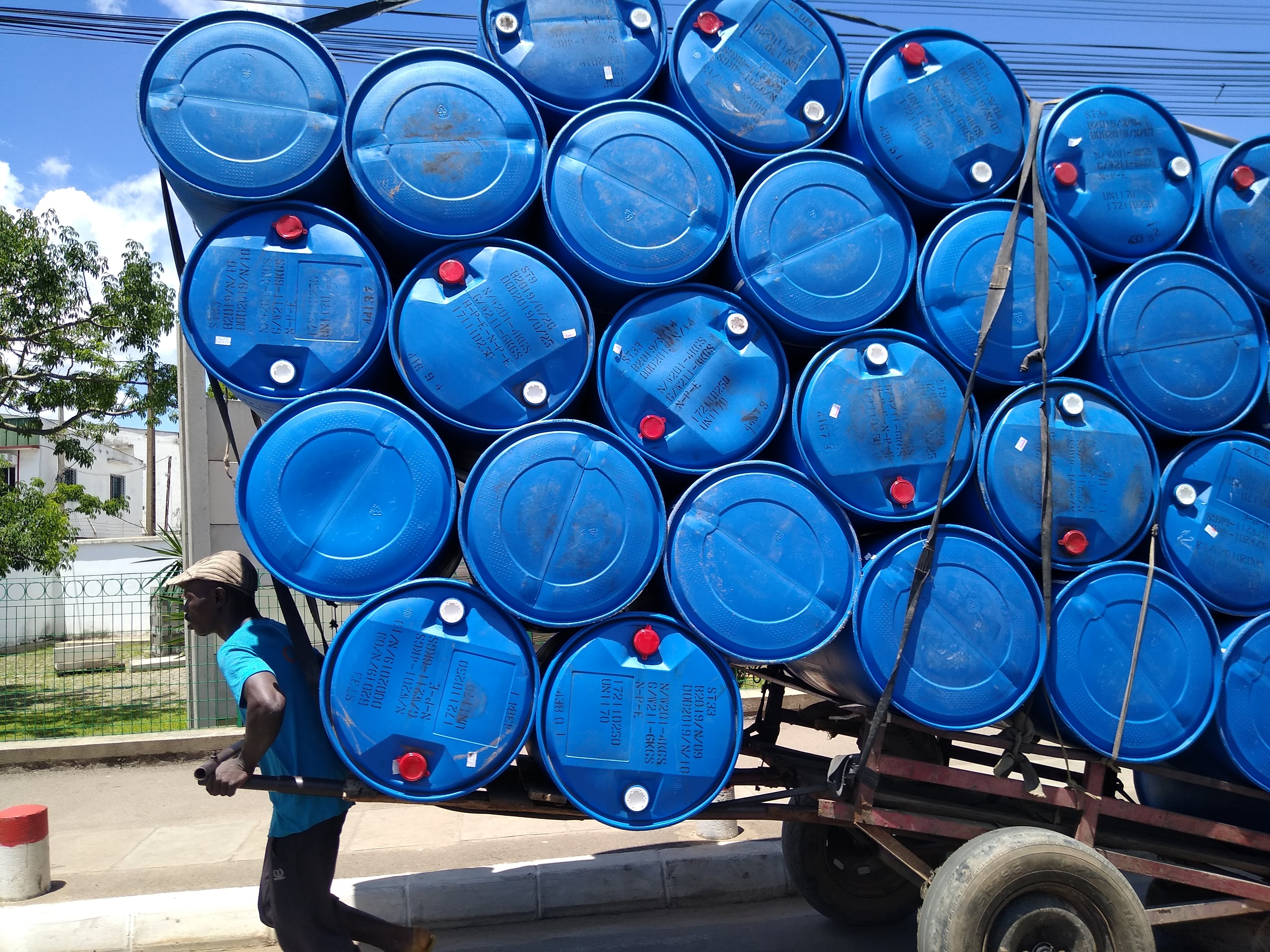
Transport of empty plastic drums by handcart

Plastic drums are typically made of blow molded high density polyethylene. They are available in a variety of sizes and constructions designed for specific purposes and markets. Plastic drums are used for liquids, granular solids, and inner packages. When designed, tested, and labeled, plastic drums can be used with dangerous goods or hazardous materials. The plastic drum, inner coating, or drum liner should be compatible with the intended contents. Foods and pharmaceuticals can be particularly sensitive. Some liquid chemicals can permeate through plastics or can cause embrittlement.

The compression stability of plastic drums can be sensitive to heat. The Plastic Drum Institute does not recommend stacking when temperatures are above about 32 °C (90 °F). Some methods of reinforcing the sidewalls are available.

Plastic drums are used for more than shipping containers. They can be used for water collection and storage. Also, plastic drums are used along highways to mark construction zones.

Applicable standards include:

- ISO 20848-2:2006. Packaging — Plastics drums — Part 1. Removable head (open head) drums with a nominal capacity of 113,6 l to 220 l
- ISO 20848-2:2006. Packaging — Plastics drums — Part 2: Non-removable head (tight head) drums with a nominal capacity of 208,2 l and 220 l
- ISO 20848-3:2018. Packaging — Plastics drums — Part 3: Plug bung closure systems for plastics drums with a nominal capacity of 113,6 l to 220 l

== See also ==
- Salvage drum
- Intermediate bulk container, for transportation of larger volumes of liquid
- Drum pump
- Drum handler
- Spill pallet
