= Toothbrush sanitizer =

Device that sanitizes toothbrushes

A toothbrush sanitizer is a device used to disinfect the tooth brush by applying short-wavelength ultraviolet (UV-C) light to kill or inactivate microorganisms. Studies in dental journals demonstrate that UV sanitizers effectively kill bacteria and microorganisms, but other forms of sanitizing, using common household products, were found to be equally or more successful at eliminating microorganisms from toothbrushes.

== See also ==
- Ultraviolet germicidal irradiation
