= Salvage drum =

Type of container

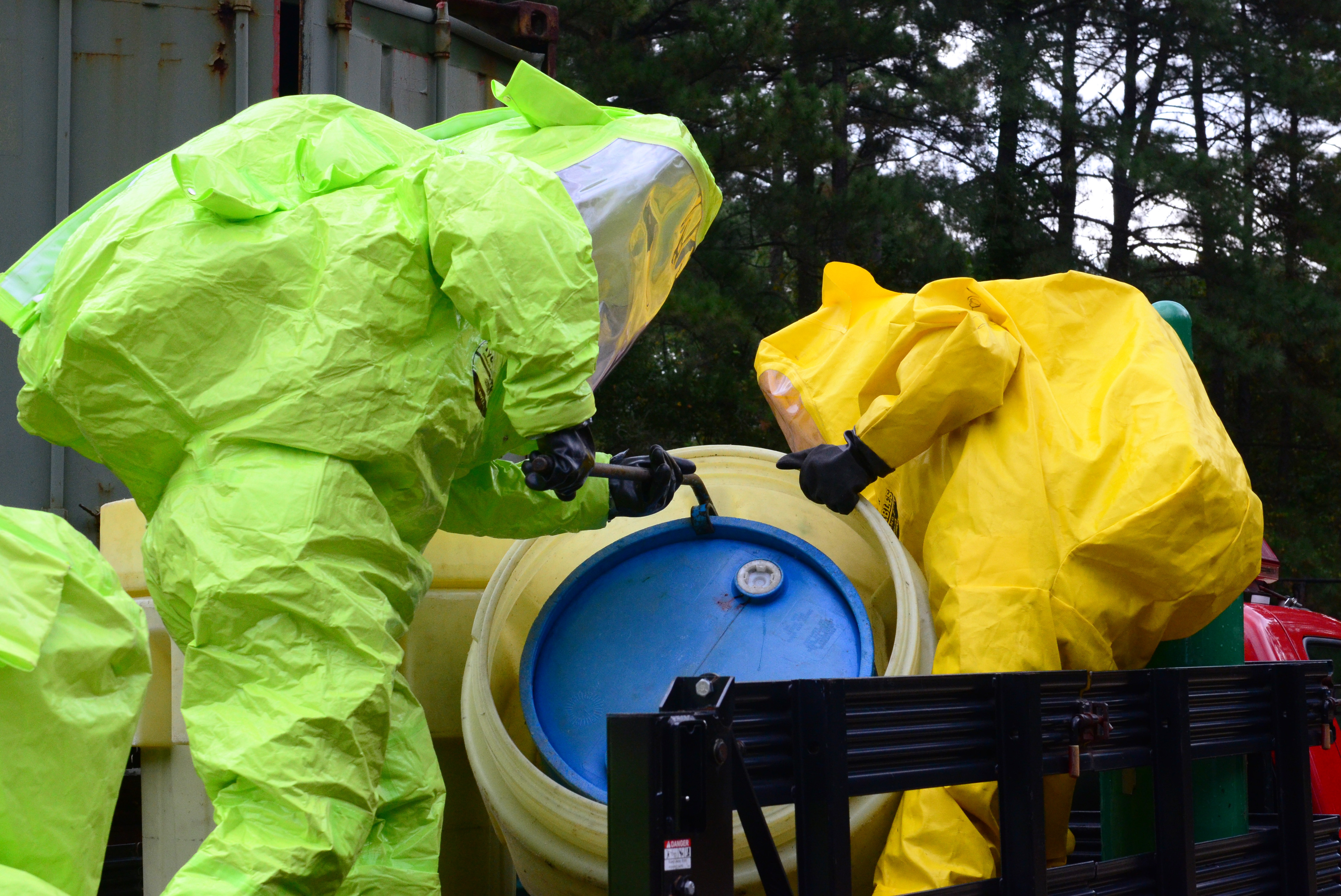
Small leaking drum being put into a larger salvage drum

A Salvage drum is an outer container used for shipping a leaking, damaged or non-compliant drum containing hazardous materials.

Several designs are available.

Originally designed to be greater than, or equal to, the construction and performance specifics of an inner container, the Performance Oriented Packaging Standards (POPS) of the US Department of Transportation requirement was that the Salvage Drum be at least a 'Z' (Packing Group III) solids container. Convinced that this was not an acceptable test for a Salvage Drum, on January 1, 1998, the 'T' Salvage Drum (1A2T) became the UN recommended salvage packaging for international shipments. The US-DOT, per 49 CFR 173.3, also recognizes the 'T' Salvage Drum for shipments within the US. Unlike the original 49 CFR Salvage Drum requirement, the 'T' Salvage Drum is most commonly an 85-US-gallon (320 L) steel drum that, meets UN Model Regulations test requirement 6.1.5.1.11, which specifies that when filled with water, the drum can qualify for Packing Group II and be dropped 1.2 metres (3.9 ft) on its most critical orientation, and not leak. In addition, the drum must successfully pass a 30 kilopascals (4.4 psi) Leakproofness Test. Both tests are very severe for an open-head steel container. This testing illustrates the extreme capabilities of the 'T' Salvage Drum when used for the safe recovery of hazardous materials in transportation.

== See also ==
- UN Recommendations on the Transport of Dangerous Goods
- Drum (container)
- Package testing
- Spill pallet
