= High-redundancy actuation =

High-redundancy actuation (HRA) is a new approach to fault-tolerant control in the area of mechanical actuation.

== Overview ==
The basic idea is to use a lot of small actuation elements, so that a fault of one element has only a minor effect on the overall system. This way, a High Redundancy Actuator can remain functional even after several elements are at fault. This property is also called graceful degradation.

Fault-tolerant operation in the presence of actuator faults requires some form of redundancy. Actuators are essential, because they are used to keep the system stable and to bring it into the desired state. Both requires a certain amount of power or force to be applied to the system. No control approach can work unless the actuators produce this necessary force.

So the common solution is to err on the side of safety by over-actuation: much more control action than strictly necessary is built into the system. For critical systems, the normal approach involves straightforward replication of the actuators. Often three or four actuators are used in parallel for aircraft flight control systems, even if one would be sufficient from a control point of view. So if one actuator fails, the remaining actuator can always keep the system operation. While this approach is certainly successful, it also makes the system expensive, heavy and ineffective.

=== Inspiration of high-redundancy actuation ===
The idea of the high-redundancy actuation (HRA) is inspired by the human musculature. A muscle is composed of many individual muscle cells, each of which provides only a minute contribution to the force and the travel of the muscle. These properties allow the muscle as a whole to be highly resilient to damage of individual cells.

== Technical realisation ==
The aim of high redundancy actuation is not to produce man-made muscles, but to use the same principle of cooperation in technical actuators to provide intrinsic fault tolerance. To achieve this, a high number of small actuator elements are assembled in parallel and in series to form one actuator (see Series and parallel circuits).

Faults within the actuator will affect the maximum capability, but through robust control, full performance can be maintained without either adaptation or reconfiguration. Some form of condition monitoring is necessary to provide warnings to the operator calling for maintenance. But this monitoring has no influence on the system itself, unlike in adaptive methods or control reconfiguration, which simplifies the design of the system significantly.

The HRA is an important new approach within the overall area of fault-tolerant control, using concepts of reliability engineering on a mechanical level. When applicable, it can provide actuators that have graceful degradation, and that continue to operate at close to nominal performance even in the presence of multiple faults in the actuator elements.

=== Using actuation elements in series ===
An important feature of the high-redundancy actuation is that the actuator elements are connected both in parallel and in series. While the parallel arrangement is commonly used, the configuration in series is rarely employed, because it is perceived to be less efficient.

However, there is one fault that is difficult to deal with in a parallel arrangement: the locking up of one actuator element. Because parallel actuator elements always have the same extension, one locked-up element can render the whole assembly useless. It is possible to mitigate this by guarding the elements against locking or by limiting the force exerted by a single element. But these measures reduce both the effectiveness of the system and introduce new points of failure.

The analysis of the serial configuration shows that it remains operational when one element is locked-up. This fact is important for the High Redundancy Actuator, as fault tolerance is required for different fault types. The goal of the HRA project is to use parallel and serial actuator elements to accommodate both the blocking and the inactivity (loss of force) of an element.

=== Available technology ===
The basic idea of high-redundancy actuation is technology agnostic: it should be applicable to a wide range of actuator technology, including different kinds of linear actuators and rotational actuators.

However, initial experiments are performed with electric actuators, especially with electromechanical and electromagnetic technology. Compared to pneumatic actuators, the electrical drive allow a much finer control of position and force.
