= Spill kit =

Spill kits are typically single-use kits containing chemicals used for absorption of (hazardous) wastes. Ready-for-use kits typically contain personal protective equipment, decontamination or neutralizing agents, disposal containers, and signage markers. Sometimes, spill containment material will also be included.

== Types ==
Specialized kits are available for specific spills:

- Infectious body fluids
- Cooking oil and food waste
- Sewage
- Corrosive and hazardous chemicals
  - Carcinogens
  - Irritants
  - Toxic substances
  - Solvents
- Petroleum (see oil spill) and p. products like
  - Fossil fuels
