= GHS hazard pictograms =

Standard set of hazard warning images

Hazard pictograms form part of the international Globally Harmonized System of Classification and Labelling of Chemicals (GHS). Two sets of pictograms are included within the GHS: one for the labelling of containers and for workplace hazard warnings, and a second for use during the transport of dangerous goods. Either one or the other is chosen, depending on the target audience, but the two are not used together for the same hazard. The two sets of pictograms use the same symbols for the same hazards, although certain symbols are not required for transport pictograms. Transport pictograms come in a wider variety of colors and may contain additional information such as a subcategory number.

Hazard pictograms are one of the key elements for the labelling of containers under the GHS, along with:

- an identification of the product;
- a signal word – either Danger or Warning – where necessary
- hazard statements, indicating the nature and degree of the risks posed by the product
- precautionary statements, indicating how the product should be handled to minimize risks to the user (as well as to other people and the general environment)
- the identity of the supplier (who might be a manufacturer or importer)

The GHS chemical hazard pictograms are intended to provide the basis for or to replace national systems of hazard pictograms. It has still to be implemented by the European Union (CLP regulation) in 2009.

The GHS transport pictograms are the same as those recommended in the UN Recommendations on the Transport of Dangerous Goods, widely implemented in national regulations such as the U.S. Federal Hazardous Materials Transportation Act (49 U.S.C. 5101–5128) and D.O.T. regulations at 49 C.F.R. 100–185.

== Physical hazards pictograms ==
Pictogram	Usage
	Unstable explosives; Explosives, divisions 1.1, 1.2, 1.3, 1.4, 1.5, 1.6; Self-reactive substances and mixtures, types A, B; Organic peroxides, types A, B; Further information: Explosive material e.g. azidoazide azide, TNT, chromyl chloride, nitroglycerin
GHS01: Explosive	Unstable explosives; Explosives, divisions 1.1, 1.2, 1.3, 1.4, 1.5, 1.6; Self-reactive substances and mixtures, types A, B; Organic peroxides, types A, B; Further information: Explosive material e.g. azidoazide azide, TNT, chromyl chloride, nitroglycerin
	Flammable gases, category 1; Flammable aerosols, categories 1, 2; Flammable liquids, categories 1, 2, 3, 4; Flammable solids, categories 1, 2; Self-reactive substances and mixtures, types B, C, D, E, F; Pyrophoric liquids, category 1; Pyrophoric solids, category 1; Combustible solids, category 3; Combustible liquids, category 3; Self-heating substances and mixtures, categories 1, 2; Substances and mixtures, which in contact with water, emit flammable gases, categories 1, 2, 3; Organic peroxides, types B, C, D, E, F; Further information: Flammability e.g. acetone, methanol, generally most solvents.
GHS02: Flammable
	Oxidizing gases, category 1; Oxidizing liquids, categories 1, 2, 3; Oxidizing solids, categories 1, 2, 3; Further information: Oxidizing agent e.g. hydrogen peroxide, most halogens, potassium permanganate, nitric acid
GHS03: Oxidizing	Oxidizing gases, category 1; Oxidizing liquids, categories 1, 2, 3; Oxidizing solids, categories 1, 2, 3; Further information: Oxidizing agent e.g. hydrogen peroxide, most halogens, potassium permanganate, nitric acid
	Compressed gases; Liquefied gases; Refrigerated liquefied gases; Dissolved gases; e.g. liquid nitrogen, liquid oxygen, liquid helium
GHS04: Compressed Gas	Compressed gases; Liquefied gases; Refrigerated liquefied gases; Dissolved gases; e.g. liquid nitrogen, liquid oxygen, liquid helium
	Corrosive to metals, category 1; Further information: Corrosive substance Strong acids/bases (nitric acid, sodium hydroxide), calcium oxide, anhydrous zinc chloride can be corrosive
GHS05: Corrosive	Corrosive to metals, category 1; Further information: Corrosive substance Strong acids/bases (nitric acid, sodium hydroxide), calcium oxide, anhydrous zinc chloride can be corrosive
	Explosives, divisions 1.5, 1.6; Flammable gases, category 2; Self-reactive substances and mixtures, type G (see HAZMAT Class 4 Flammable solids); Organic peroxides, type G
no pictogram required	Explosives, divisions 1.5, 1.6; Flammable gases, category 2; Self-reactive substances and mixtures, type G (see HAZMAT Class 4 Flammable solids); Organic peroxides, type G

== Health hazards pictograms ==
Pictogram	Usage
	Acute toxicity (oral, dermal, inhalation), categories 1, 2, 3; e.g. manganese heptoxide (fire diamond rating at health hazard is 4) [verify?]
GHS06: Toxic	Acute toxicity (oral, dermal, inhalation), categories 1, 2, 3; e.g. manganese heptoxide (fire diamond rating at health hazard is 4) [verify?]
	Acute toxicity (oral, dermal, inhalation), category 4; Skin irritation, categories 2, 3; Eye irritation, category 2A; Skin sensitization, category 1; Specific target organ toxicity following single exposure, category 3; Respiratory tract irritation; Narcotic effects; Not used: with the "skull and crossbones" pictogram; for skin or eye irritation if: the "corrosion" pictogram also appears; the "health hazard" pictogram is used to indicate respiratory
GHS07: Health Hazard/Hazardous to the Atmospheric System	Acute toxicity (oral, dermal, inhalation), category 4; Skin irritation, categories 2, 3; Eye irritation, category 2A; Skin sensitization, category 1; Specific target organ toxicity following single exposure, category 3; Respiratory tract irritation; Narcotic effects; Not used: with the "skull and crossbones" pictogram; for skin or eye irritation if: the "corrosion" pictogram also appears; the "health hazard" pictogram is used to indicate respiratory
	Respiratory sensitization, category 1; Germ cell mutagenicity, categories 1A, 1B, 2; Carcinogenicity, categories 1A, 1B, 2; Reproductive toxicity, categories 1A, 1B, 2; Specific target organ toxicity following single exposure, categories 1, 2; Specific target organ toxicity following repeated exposure, categories 1, 2; Aspiration hazard, categories 1, 2; e.g. chromium, cadmium
GHS08: Serious Health Hazard	Respiratory sensitization, category 1; Germ cell mutagenicity, categories 1A, 1B, 2; Carcinogenicity, categories 1A, 1B, 2; Reproductive toxicity, categories 1A, 1B, 2; Specific target organ toxicity following single exposure, categories 1, 2; Specific target organ toxicity following repeated exposure, categories 1, 2; Aspiration hazard, categories 1, 2; e.g. chromium, cadmium
	Acute toxicity (oral, dermal, inhalation), category 5; Eye irritation, category 2B; Reproductive toxicity – effects on or via lactation
no pictogram required	Acute toxicity (oral, dermal, inhalation), category 5; Eye irritation, category 2B; Reproductive toxicity – effects on or via lactation

== Physical and health hazard pictograms ==
Pictogram	Usage
	Explosives, divisions 1.5, 1.6; Flammable gases, category 2; Self-reactive substances and mixtures, type G (see HAZMAT Class 4 Flammable solids); Organic peroxides, type G; Skin corrosion, categories 1A, 1B, 1C; Serious eye damage, category 1
GHS05: Corrosive	Explosives, divisions 1.5, 1.6; Flammable gases, category 2; Self-reactive substances and mixtures, type G (see HAZMAT Class 4 Flammable solids); Organic peroxides, type G; Skin corrosion, categories 1A, 1B, 1C; Serious eye damage, category 1

== Environmental hazards pictograms ==
Pictogram	Usage
	Acute hazards to the aquatic environment, category 1; Chronic hazards to the aquatic environment, categories 1, 2
GHS09: Hazardous to the Environment	Acute hazards to the aquatic environment, category 1; Chronic hazards to the aquatic environment, categories 1, 2
	Acute hazards to the aquatic environment, categories 2, 3; Chronic hazards to the aquatic environment, categories 3, 4
no pictogram required	Acute hazards to the aquatic environment, categories 2, 3; Chronic hazards to the aquatic environment, categories 3, 4

== Transport pictograms ==
=== Class 1: Explosives ===
Pictogram	Usage
	Explosives Division 1.1: Substances and articles which have a mass explosion hazard Division 1.2: Substances and articles which have a projection hazard but not a mass explosion hazard Division 1.3: Substances and articles which have a fire hazard and either a minor blast hazard or a minor projection hazard or both, but not a mass explosion hazard Note: The asterisks are replaced by the class number and compatibility code
Divisions 1.1–1.3	Explosives Division 1.1: Substances and articles which have a mass explosion hazard Division 1.2: Substances and articles which have a projection hazard but not a mass explosion hazard Division 1.3: Substances and articles which have a fire hazard and either a minor blast hazard or a minor projection hazard or both, but not a mass explosion hazard Note: The asterisks are replaced by the class number and compatibility code
	Explosives – Substances and articles which are classified as explosives but which present no significant hazard Note: The asterisk is replaced by the compatibility code
Division 1.4	Explosives – Substances and articles which are classified as explosives but which present no significant hazard Note: The asterisk is replaced by the compatibility code
	Explosives – Very insensitive substances which have a mass explosion hazard Note: The asterisk is replaced by the compatibility code
Division 1.5	Explosives – Very insensitive substances which have a mass explosion hazard Note: The asterisk is replaced by the compatibility code
	Explosives – No hazard statement Note: The asterisk is replaced by the compatibility code
Division 1.6	Explosives – No hazard statement Note: The asterisk is replaced by the compatibility code

=== Class 2: Gases ===
Pictogram	Usage
	Flammable gases – Gases which at 20 °C and a standard pressure of 101.3 kPa: are ignitable when in a mixture of 13 percent or less by volume with air; or; have a flammable range with air of at least 12 percentage points regardless of the lower flammable limit.; Alternative sign
Division 2.1	Flammable gases – Gases which at 20 °C and a standard pressure of 101.3 kPa: are ignitable when in a mixture of 13 percent or less by volume with air; or; have a flammable range with air of at least 12 percentage points regardless of the lower flammable limit.; Alternative sign
	Non-flammable non-toxic gases – Gases which: are asphyxiant – gases which dilute or replace the oxygen normally in the atmosphere; or; are oxidizing – gases which may, generally by providing oxygen, cause or contribute to the combustion of other material more than air does; or; do not come under the other divisions.; Alternative sign
Division 2.2	Non-flammable non-toxic gases – Gases which: are asphyxiant – gases which dilute or replace the oxygen normally in the atmosphere; or; are oxidizing – gases which may, generally by providing oxygen, cause or contribute to the combustion of other material more than air does; or; do not come under the other divisions.; Alternative sign
	Toxic gases – Gases which: are known to be so toxic or corrosive to humans as to pose a hazard to health; or; are presumed to be toxic or corrosive to humans because they have an LC_{50} value equal to or less than 5000 ml/m^{3} (ppm).; e.g. hydrogen cyanide
Division 2.3	Toxic gases – Gases which: are known to be so toxic or corrosive to humans as to pose a hazard to health; or; are presumed to be toxic or corrosive to humans because they have an LC_{50} value equal to or less than 5000 ml/m^{3} (ppm).; e.g. hydrogen cyanide

=== Classes 3 and 4: Flammable liquids and solids ===
Pictogram	Usage
	Flammable liquids – Liquids which have a flash point of less than 60 °C and which are capable of sustaining combustion e.g. acetone Alternative sign
Class 3	Flammable liquids – Liquids which have a flash point of less than 60 °C and which are capable of sustaining combustion e.g. acetone Alternative sign
	Flammable solids, self-reactive substances and solid desensitized explosives – Solids which, under conditions encountered in transport, are readily combustible or may cause or contribute to fire through friction; self-reactive substances which are liable to undergo a strongly exothermic reaction; solid desensitized explosives which may explode if not diluted sufficiently
Division 4.1	Flammable solids, self-reactive substances and solid desensitized explosives – Solids which, under conditions encountered in transport, are readily combustible or may cause or contribute to fire through friction; self-reactive substances which are liable to undergo a strongly exothermic reaction; solid desensitized explosives which may explode if not diluted sufficiently
	Substances liable to spontaneous combustion – Substances which are liable to spontaneous heating under normal conditions encountered in transport, or to heating up in contact with air, and being then liable to catch fire e.g. manganese heptoxide
Division 4.2	Substances liable to spontaneous combustion – Substances which are liable to spontaneous heating under normal conditions encountered in transport, or to heating up in contact with air, and being then liable to catch fire e.g. manganese heptoxide
	Substances which in contact with water emit flammable gases – Substances which, by interaction with water, are liable to become spontaneously flammable or to give off flammable gases in dangerous quantities e.g. calcium carbide, sodium Alternative sign
Division 4.3	Substances which in contact with water emit flammable gases – Substances which, by interaction with water, are liable to become spontaneously flammable or to give off flammable gases in dangerous quantities e.g. calcium carbide, sodium Alternative sign

=== Other GHS transport classes ===
Pictogram	Usage
	Oxidizing substances – Substances which, while in themselves not necessarily combustible, may, generally by yielding oxygen, cause, or contribute to, the combustion of other material
Division 5.1	Oxidizing substances – Substances which, while in themselves not necessarily combustible, may, generally by yielding oxygen, cause, or contribute to, the combustion of other material
	Organic peroxides – Organic substances which contain the bivalent –O–O– structure and may be considered derivatives of hydrogen peroxide, where one or both of the hydrogen atoms have been replaced by organic radicals Alternative sign
Division 5.2	Organic peroxides – Organic substances which contain the bivalent –O–O– structure and may be considered derivatives of hydrogen peroxide, where one or both of the hydrogen atoms have been replaced by organic radicals Alternative sign
	Toxic substances – Substances with an LD_{50} value ≤ 300 mg/kg (oral) or ≤ 1000 mg/kg (dermal) or an LC_{50} value ≤ 4000 ml/m^{3} (inhalation of dusts or mists) e.g. nearly everything that contains cyanide groups
Division 6.1	Toxic substances – Substances with an LD_{50} value ≤ 300 mg/kg (oral) or ≤ 1000 mg/kg (dermal) or an LC_{50} value ≤ 4000 ml/m^{3} (inhalation of dusts or mists) e.g. nearly everything that contains cyanide groups
	Corrosive substances – Substances which: cause absolute thickness destruction of intact skin tissue and epidermis on exposure time of less than 4 hours; or; exhibit a corrosion rate of more than 6.25 mm per year on either steel or aluminium surfaces at 55 °C
Class 8	Corrosive substances – Substances which: cause absolute thickness destruction of intact skin tissue and epidermis on exposure time of less than 4 hours; or; exhibit a corrosion rate of more than 6.25 mm per year on either steel or aluminium surfaces at 55 °C

=== Non-GHS transport pictograms ===
The following pictograms are included in the UN Model Regulations but have not been incorporated into the GHS because of the nature of the hazards.

Class 6.2	Class 7	Class 9
Infectious substance	Radioactive material	Miscellaneous dangerous substances and articles

== See also ==
- Globally Harmonized System of Classification and Labelling of Chemicals
- Hazard symbol
- HMIS Color Bar
- Hazchem
- Hazmat
- NFPA 704
