= Hazchem =

Warning plate system used in some countries

A sample Hazchem plate for petrol.

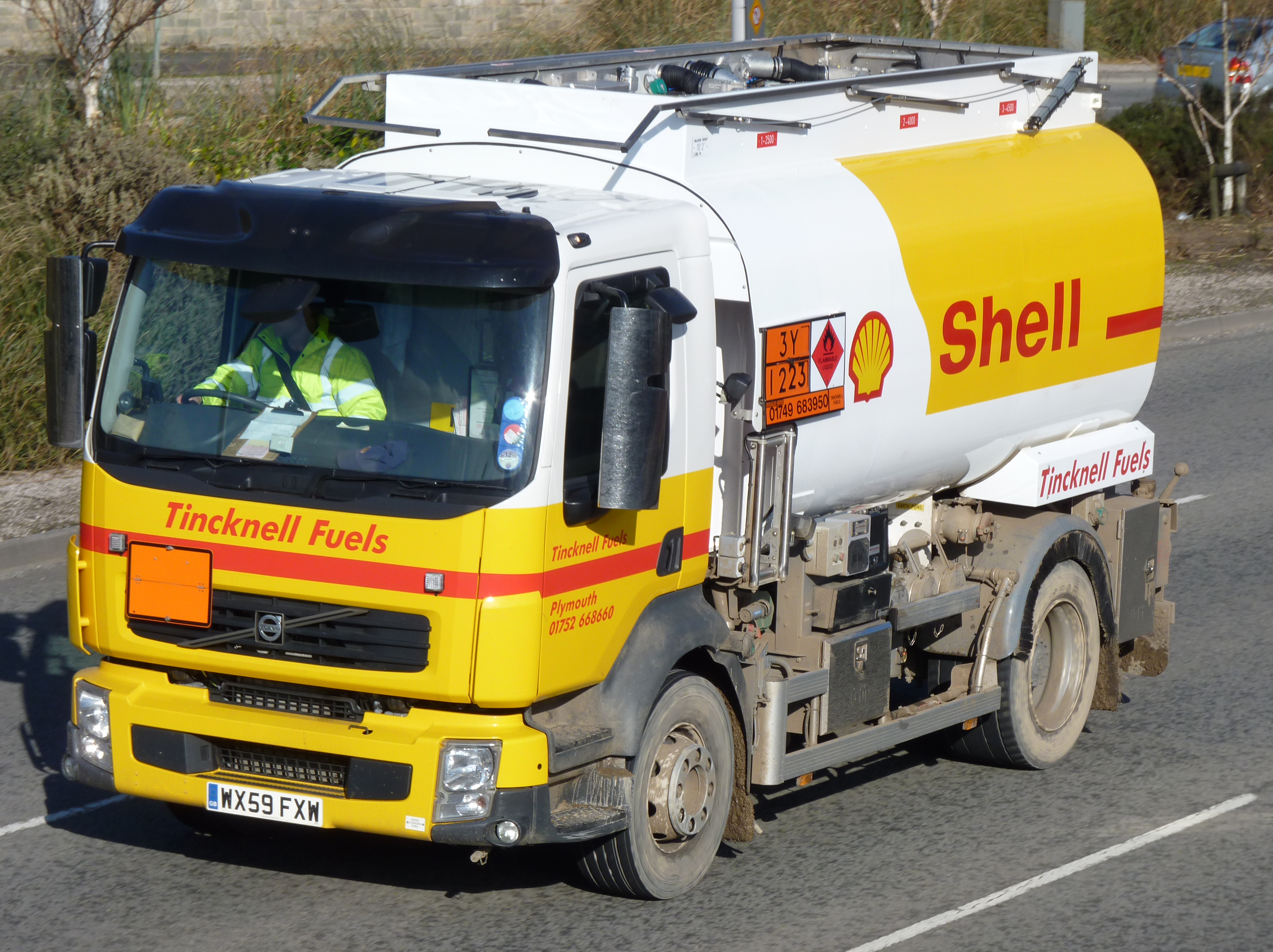
A tanker carrying Kerosene with a Hazchem plate affixed to the side of the tank.

Hazchem (/ˈhæzkɛm/; from hazardous chemicals) is a warning plate system used in Australia, Hong Kong, Malaysia, New Zealand, India and the United Kingdom for vehicles transporting hazardous substances, and on storage facilities. The top-left section of the plate gives the Emergency Action Code (EAC, authored by WSP (previously Ricardo)), outlining the recommended course of action for the fire brigade in case of an accident or fire. The middle-left section containing a 4 digit number gives the UN Substance Identification Number describing the material. The lower-left section gives the telephone number that should be called if special advice is needed. The warning symbol in the top right indicates the general hazard class of the material. The bottom-right of the plate carries a company logo or name.

There is also a standard null Hazchem plate to indicate the transport of non-hazardous substances. The null plate does not include an EAC or substance identification.

The National Chemical Emergency Centre (NCEC) in the United Kingdom provides a Free Online Hazchem Guide.

== Emergency Action Code ==
The Emergency Action Code (EAC) is a three character code displayed on all dangerous goods classed carriers, and provides a quick assessment to first responders and emergency responders (i.e. fire fighters and police) of what actions to take should the carrier carrying such goods become involved in an incident (traffic collision, for example). EACs are characterised by a single number (1 to 4) and either one or two letters (depending on the hazard).

NCEC was commissioned by the Department for Communities and Local Government (CLG) to edit the EAC List 2013 publication, outlining the application of Hazchem Emergency Action Codes (EAC's) for use in Britain and now carries out regular updates of the list. The Dangerous Goods Emergency Action Code (EAC) List is reviewed every two years and is an essential compliance document for all emergency services, local government and for those who may control the planning for, and prevention of, emergencies involving dangerous goods. The current EAC List was authored by Ricardo (now part of WSP, and is available on the EMAQ+ website) with updates including new entries for sodium ion and lithium ion batteries, and published by the Stationery Office (TSO) in 2025. NCEC (now part of WSP) has been at the heart of the UK EAC system since its inception in the early 1970s.

The printed version of the book can be purchased from TSO directly (ISBN 978-0-11-754174-0) or downloaded as a PDF file from the Ricardo website an older version is available as an archived document PDF file from NCEC's website.

=== HazChem fire suppression ===
The number leading the EAC indicates the type of fire-suppressing agent that should be used to prevent or extinguish a fire caused by the chemical.

Number	Action
1	Coarse water spray
2	Water fog or fine spray
•2	Alcohol-resistant foam, or fine water spray if necessary^{*}
3	Foam
•3	Alcohol-resistant foam, or normal foam if necessary^{*}
4	Dry agent - never water

^{*} These indicators are used only in product documentation and are displayed on vehicle plates as 2 and 3 respectively.

The system ranks suppression media in order of their suitability, so that a fire may be fought with a suppression medium of equal or higher EAC number. For example, a chemical with EAC number 2 - indicating water fog - may be fought additionally with media 3 (foam) or 4 (dry agent), but not with 1 (coarse spray). This is especially important for chemicals requiring medium 4 (dry agent), as these chemicals react violently with water and so using lowered-number media will be actively dangerous.

=== HazChem safety parameters ===
Each EAC contains at least one letter, which determines which category the chemical falls under, and which also highlights the violence of the chemical (i.e. likelihood to spontaneously combust, explode etc.), what personal protective equipment to use while working around the chemical and what action to take when disposing of the chemical.

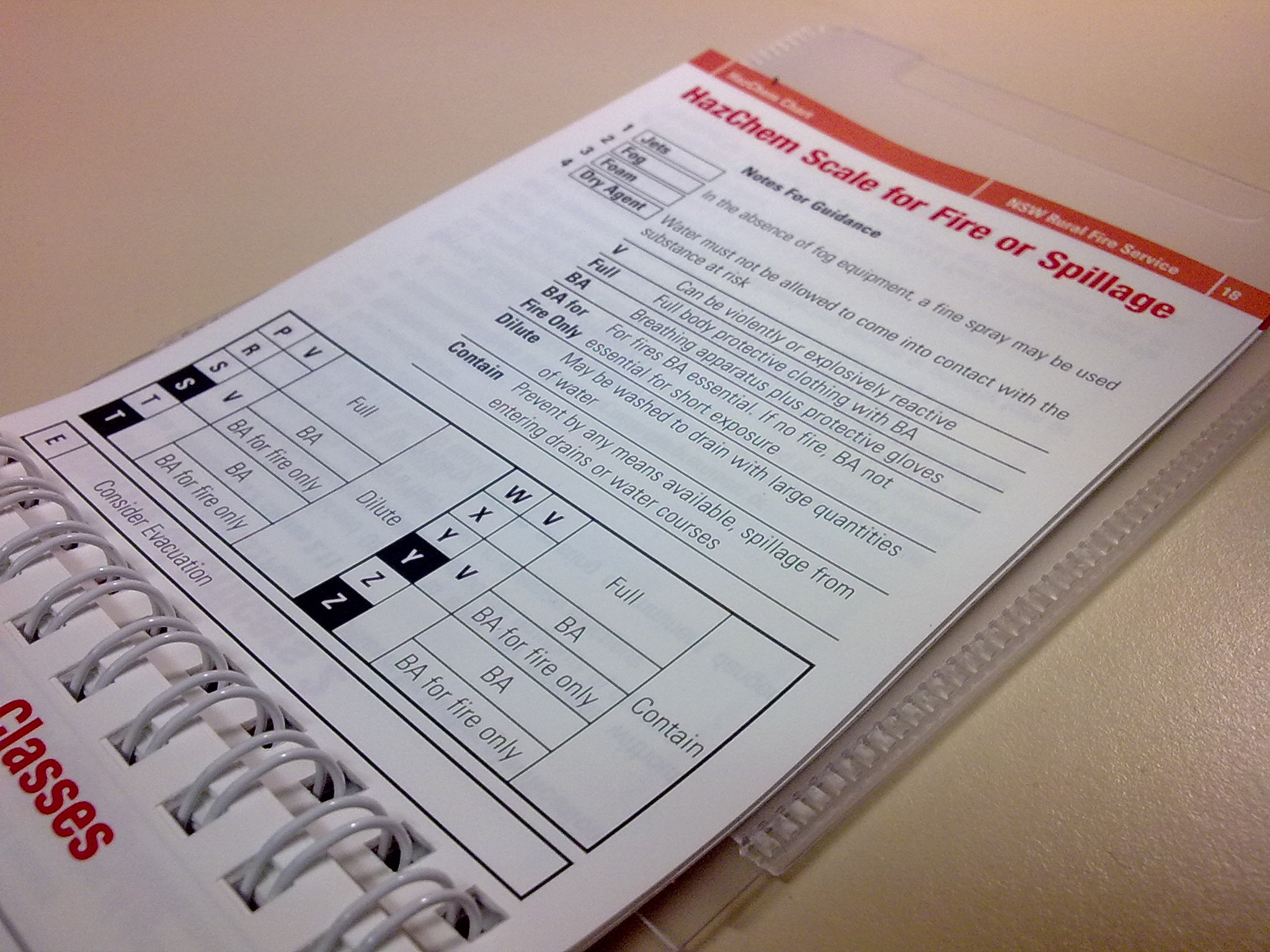
HazChem information within the NSW Rural Fire Service Firefighters' Pocket Book.

Category	Violence	Protection	Substance control
P	V	Full	Dilute
R		Full	Dilute
S	V	BA	Dilute
S	V	BA for fire only	Dilute
T		BA	Dilute
T		BA for fire only	Dilute
W	V	Full	Contain
X		Full	Contain
Y	V	BA	Contain
Y	V	BA for fire only	Contain
Z		BA	Contain
Z		BA for fire only	Contain
E	Consider evacuation		

Comparison denoting the difference between PPE deployment with 3YE chemicals

Each category is assigned a letter to determine what actions are required when handling, containing and disposing of the chemical in question. Eight 'major categories' exist which are commonly denoted by a black letter on a white background. Four subcategories exist which specifically deal with what type of personal protective equipment responders must wear when handling the emergency, denoted by a white letter on a black background. In Australia with the update of the Australian Dangerous Goods Code volume 7 as of 2010, the white letter on a black background has been removed, making BA (breathing apparatus) a requirement at all large incidents regardless of whether the substance is involved in a fire.

If a category is classed as violent, this means that the chemical can be violently or explosively reactive, either with the atmosphere or water, or both (which could be marked by the Dangerous when Wet symbol).

Protection is divided up into three categories of personal protective equipment, Full, BA and BA for fire only. Full denotes that full personal protective equipment provisions must be used around and in contact with the chemical, which will usually include a portable breathing apparatus and water tight and chemical proof suit. BA (acronym for breathing apparatus) specifies that a portable breathing apparatus must be used at all times in and around the chemical, and BA for fire only specifies that a breathing apparatus is not necessary for short exposure periods to the chemical but is required if the chemical is alight. BA for fire only is denoted within the emergency action code as a white letter on a black background, while a black letter on a white background denotes breathing apparatus at all times. When changing the background colour is not possible (such as with handwriting), the use of brackets means the same as a black background. "3[Y]E" means the same as "3YE" (a white letter on a black background).

Substance control specifies what to do with the chemical in the event of a spill, either dilute or contain. Dilute means that the chemical may be washed down the drain with large quantities of water. Contain requires that the spillage must not come in contact with drains or water courses.

In the event of a chemical incident, the EAC may specify that an evacuation may be necessary as the chemical poses a public hazard which may extend beyond the immediate vicinity. If evacuation is not possible, advice to stay in doors and secure all points of ventilation may be necessary. This condition is denoted by an E at the end of any emergency action code. It is an optional letter, depending on the nature of the chemical.

=== Examples ===
3	Y	E	Use foam or dry agent, substance reacts violently/is explosive, BA use is essential, evacuate vicinity, contain spill.
3	Y	E	Use foam or dry agent, substance reacts violently/is explosive, Use BA if fire present, evacuate vicinity, contain spill.
2	R		Use fog, foam or dry agent, substance is not violent, use full PPE, dilute spill.
4	X		Use dry agent only, substance is not violent, full PPE essential, contain spill.
1	S	E	Use jets, fog, foam or dry agent; BA for fire only; evacuate vicinity; dilute spill.

A very commonly displayed example is 3YE on petrol tankers. This means that a fire must be fought using foam or dry agent (if a small fire), that it can react violently and is explosive, that fire fighters must wear a portable breathing apparatus at all times, or if a white on black Y, only if there is a fire, and that the run-off needs to be contained. It also indicates to the incident controller that evacuation of the surrounding area may be necessary.

=== Calculation of Hazchem action code for multi-loads or sites with multiple Hazchem codes ===
Example:

There are three substances to be carried as a multi-load, having emergency action codes of 3Y, •2S and 4WE.

1st Character (Number): The first character of the EAC for each of the three substances is 3, 2 and 4. The highest number must be taken as the first character of the code for the multi-load and therefore the first character will be 4. The bullet in •2S is not assigned to the mixed load because other EACs do not include a bullet.

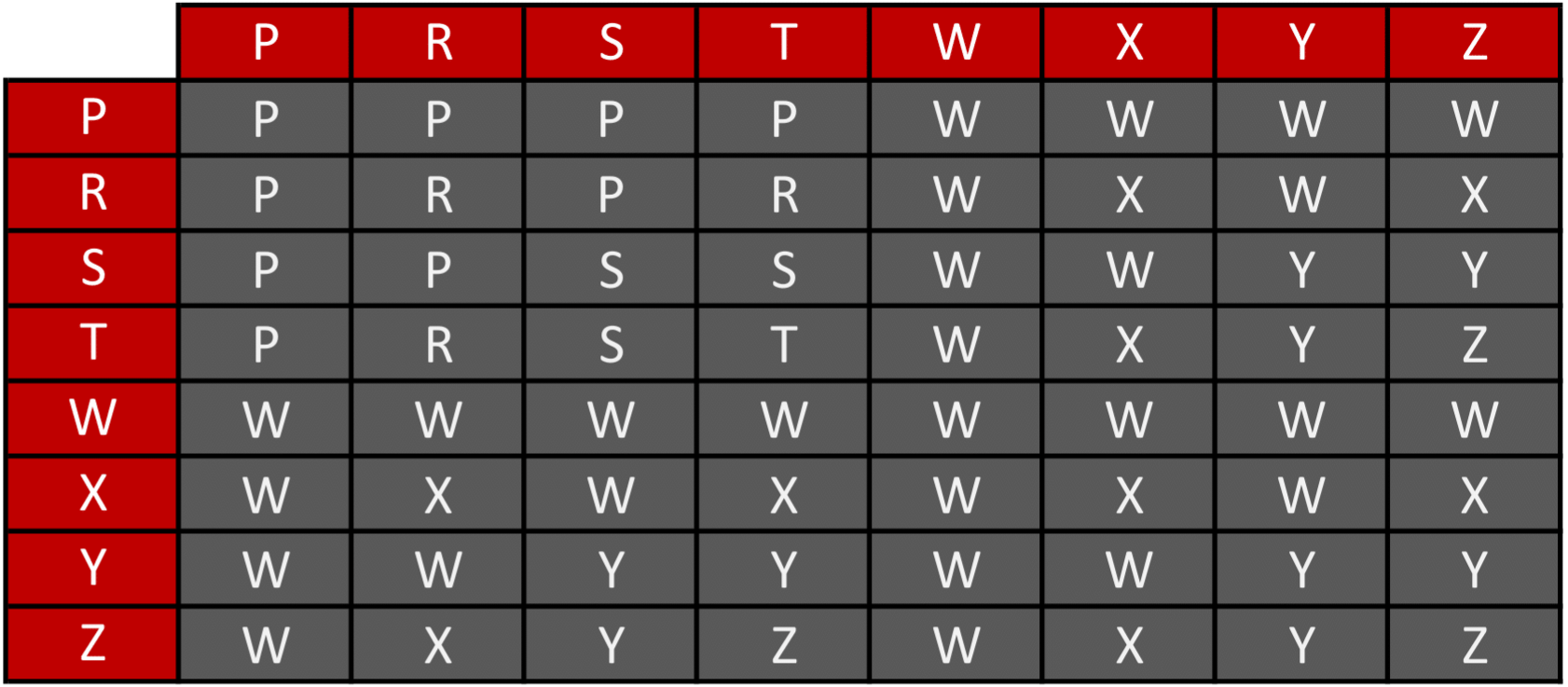
Chart used to determine the correct Hazchem letter code to be used when transporting multi-loads

2nd Character (Letter): The second character for the EAC for each of the three substances is Y, S and W. The correct character to use may be determined with the chart on the right. Taking the Y along the top row of the chart, and the S along the left hand column, the intersection is at Y and therefore the character for the first two substances would be Y. This resultant character (Y) is then taken along the top row and the character for the third substance (W) is taken along the left hand column. The intersection point is now W. The second character of the code for the three substances is therefore W.

The second character can also be determined using the table below. When assigning a new character to a multi load EAC, three things must be taken into consideration, substance control - if any one of the hazardous chemicals require containment the entire load must be contained, Protection - if any one of the hazardous chemicals require the use of full PPE the entire load requires the use of full PPE, and Violence - if any one of the hazardous chemicals are violent the entire load must be considered violent.

Working from right to left with the table below, The new second character for a multi load can be determined. the following examples will act as a guideline for the method.

Example 1:

A multi load consisting of category P and T hazardous chemicals. First, compare the substance control method of both categories, in this example both categories should be diluted, so the resulting character will align with "Dilute" in the table. second, compare the protection required by the two categories, in this example category P requires full PPE, and category T requires the use of breathing apparatus, so the resulting character will align with "Full" in the table. Third, compare the violence of the two categories, in this example category P is considered violent and category T is not, so the resulting character will align with "V" in the table. combining the three requirements the resultant category is P which is violent, requires full PPE and should be diluted.

Example 2:

A multi load consisting of category R and Z hazardous chemicals. First, compare the substance control method of both categories, in this example category R should be diluted, and category Z should be contained, so the resulting character will align with "Contain" in the table. second, compare the protection required by the two categories, in this example category R requires full PPE, and category Z requires the use of breathing apparatus, so the resulting character will align with "Full" in the table. Third, compare the violence of the two categories, in this example both categories are considered non-violent, so the resulting character will align with a blank space in the table. combining the three requirements the resultant category is X which is non-violent, requires full PPE and should be contained.

Example 3:

A multi load consisting of category T and Z hazardous chemicals. First, compare the substance control method of both categories, in this example category T should be diluted, and category Z should be contained, so the resulting character will align with "Contain" in the table. second, compare the protection required by the two categories, in this example both categories require the use of breathing apparatus, so the resulting character will align with "BA" in the table. Third, compare the violence of the two categories, in this example both categories are considered non-violent, so the resulting character will align with a blank space in the table. combining the three requirements the resultant category is Z which is non-violent, requires the use of breathing apparatus and should be contained.

Category	Violence	Protection	Substance control
P	V	Full	Dilute
R		Full	Dilute
S	V	BA	Dilute
S	V	BA for fire only	Dilute
T		BA	Dilute
T		BA for fire only	Dilute
W	V	Full	Contain
X		Full	Contain
Y	V	BA	Contain
Y	V	BA for fire only	Contain
Z		BA	Contain
Z		BA for fire only	Contain
E	Consider evacuation		

Letter 'E': The third substance has an 'E' as a third character and therefore the multi-load must also have an 'E'.

The resultant Hazchem Code for the three substances carried as a multi-load will therefore be 4WE.

== See also ==
- Hazmat
- NFPA 704—the equivalent system for marking the presence of dangerous goods buildings and fixed storage tanks in the United States, intended for emergency services.
- ADR—the equivalent system used for identifying dangerous goods while being transported in mainland Europe.
- Globally Harmonized System of Classification and Labelling of Chemicals—a new international standard for marking hazardous materials.
- Hazardous Materials Identification System—a system for marking dangerous materials in the United States, intended for workers.
