= HMIS =

HMIS may refer to:

- Homeless Management Information Systems
- Hazardous Materials Identification System
- Hazardous Materials Inventory Sheet
- The HMIS Color Bar rating system.
- Her Majesty's Indian Ship, ships of the former Royal Indian Navy
- Health Management Information System
- Hospital management information system
