= NFPA 704 =

Hazmat labeling system

Standard System for the Identification of the Hazards of Materials for Emergency Response

NFPA 704: Standard System for the Identification of the Hazards of Materials for Emergency Response is a standard maintained by the U.S.-based National Fire Protection Association. First tentatively adopted as a guide in 1960, and revised several times since then, it defines the Safety Square or Fire Diamond which is used to quickly and easily identify the risks posed by hazardous materials. This helps determine what, if any, special equipment should be used, procedures followed, or precautions taken during the initial stages of an emergency response. It is an internationally accepted safety standard, and is crucial while transporting potentially hazardous chemicals.

== Usage ==
NFPA 704 is designed to quickly inform first responders of the hazards of a facility during an emergency. Thus, they are placed in all places an emergency responder might enter a facility. The minimum requirements for placement listed by the NFPA are:

- Two exterior walls or enclosures containing a means of access to a building or facility,
- Each access to a room or area,
- Each principal means of access to an exterior storage area.

In many cases, storage containers and tanks are also labeled with fire diamonds.

== Codes ==
The four divisions of the square are typically color-coded, with red on top indicating flammability, blue on the left indicating level of health hazard, yellow on the right for chemical reactivity, and white containing codes for special hazards not covered by the first three squares. Each of health, flammability and reactivity is rated on a scale from 0 (no reasonable hazard) to 4 (severe hazard). The latest version of NFPA 704 sections 5, 6, 7 and 8 for the specifications of each classification are listed below. The numeric values in the first column are designated in the standard by "Degree of Hazard" using Arabic numerals (0, 1, 2, 3, 4), not to be confused with other classification systems, such as that in the NFPA 30 Flammable and Combustible Liquids Code, where flammable and combustible liquid categories are designated by "Class", using Roman numerals (I, II, III).

Flammability (red)
0	Materials that will not burn under typical fire conditions (e.g., carbon tetrachloride, silicon dioxide, perfluorohexane, water), including intrinsically noncombustible materials such as concrete, stone, and sand. Materials that will not burn in air unless exposed to a temperature of 820 °C (1,500 °F) for more than 5 minutes.
1	Materials that require considerable preheating, under all ambient temperature conditions, before ignition and combustion can occur (e.g., mineral oil, ammonia, ethylene glycol). Includes some finely divided suspended solids that do not require heating before ignition can occur. Flash point at or above 93.3 °C (200 °F).
2	Must be moderately heated or exposed to relatively high ambient temperature before ignition can occur (e.g., diesel fuel, paper, sulfur and some finely divided suspended solids that do not require heating before ignition can occur). Flash point between 37.8 and 93.3 °C (100 and 200 °F).
3	Materials (including finely divided suspended solids) that can be ignited under almost all ambient temperature conditions (e.g., acetone, ethanol). Liquids having a flash point below 22.8 °C (73 °F) and having a boiling point at or above 37.8 °C (100 °F) or having a flash point between 22.8 and 37.8 °C (73 and 100 °F).
4	Will rapidly or completely vaporize at normal atmospheric pressure and temperature, or is readily dispersed in air and will burn readily (e.g., gasoline, acetylene, propane, hydrogen gas, diborane, tert-butyllithium). Includes pyrophoric substances. Flash point below room temperature at 22.8 °C (73 °F).

Health (blue)
0	Poses no health hazard, requires no precautions, and would offer no hazard beyond that of ordinary combustible materials (e.g., wood, sugar, salt, propylene glycol)
1	Exposure would cause irritation with only minor residual injury (e.g., acetone, sodium bromate, potassium chloride)
2	Intense or continued but not chronic exposure could cause temporary incapacitation or possible residual injury (e.g., diethyl ether, ammonium phosphate, carbon dioxide, chloroform, DEET, capsaicin).
3	Short exposure could cause serious temporary or moderate residual injury (e.g., liquid hydrogen, sulfuric acid, calcium hypochlorite, carbon monoxide, hexafluorosilicic acid, zinc chloride, sodium hydroxide)
4	Very short exposure could cause death or major residual injury (e.g. aluminum phosphide, hydrogen cyanide, phosgene, diborane, methyl isocyanate, hydrofluoric acid, sarin, mustard gas, tert-butyllithium)

Instability–reactivity (yellow)
0	Normally stable, even under fire exposure conditions, and is not reactive with water (e.g., helium, N_{2}, carbon dioxide)
1	Normally stable, but can become unstable at elevated temperatures and pressures (e.g., propene, ammonium acetate, carbonic acid)
2	Undergoes violent chemical change at elevated temperatures and pressures, reacts violently with water, or may form explosive mixtures with water (e.g., white phosphorus, potassium, sodium)
3	Capable of detonation or explosive decomposition but requires a strong initiating source, must be heated under confinement before initiation, reacts explosively with water, or will detonate if severely shocked (e.g., ammonium nitrate, caesium, hydrogen peroxide)
4	Readily capable of detonation or explosive decomposition at normal temperatures and pressures (e.g., nitroglycerin, chlorine dioxide, nitrogen triiodide, manganese heptoxide, TNT, picric acid, tert-butyllithium)

Special notice (white)
The white "special notice" area can contain several symbols. The following symbols are defined by the NFPA 704 standard.
OX	Oxidizer, allows chemicals to burn without an air supply (e.g., potassium perchlorate, ammonium nitrate, hydrogen peroxide).
~~W~~	Reacts with water in an unusual or dangerous manner (e.g., caesium, sodium, diborane, sulfuric acid, tert-butyllithium).
SA	Simple asphyxiant gas (specifically noble gases or nitrogen). The SA symbol is also used for liquified carbon dioxide vapor withdrawal systems and where large quantities of dry ice are used in confined areas.

Non-standard symbols (white)
These hazard codes are not part of the NFPA 704 standard, but are occasionally used in an unofficial manner. The use of non-standard codes may be permitted, required or disallowed by the authority having jurisdiction (e.g., fire department).
—	No special notice (the correct format is to leave the white square blank, but sometimes a dash is used)
COR	Corrosive; strong acid or base (e.g., sulfuric acid, potassium hydroxide)
CORR	Corrosive; strong acid or base (e.g., sulfuric acid, potassium hydroxide)
ACID	Acid
ALK	Alkaline
BIO	Biological hazard (e.g., flu virus, rabies virus)
POI	Poisonous (e.g., strychnine, alpha-amanitin)
RA	Radioactive (e.g., plutonium, cobalt-60, carbon-14)
RAD	Radioactive (e.g., plutonium, cobalt-60, carbon-14)
CRY	Cryogenic (e.g., liquid nitrogen)
CRYO	Cryogenic (e.g., liquid nitrogen)
G OX	Oxidizing gases

== History ==
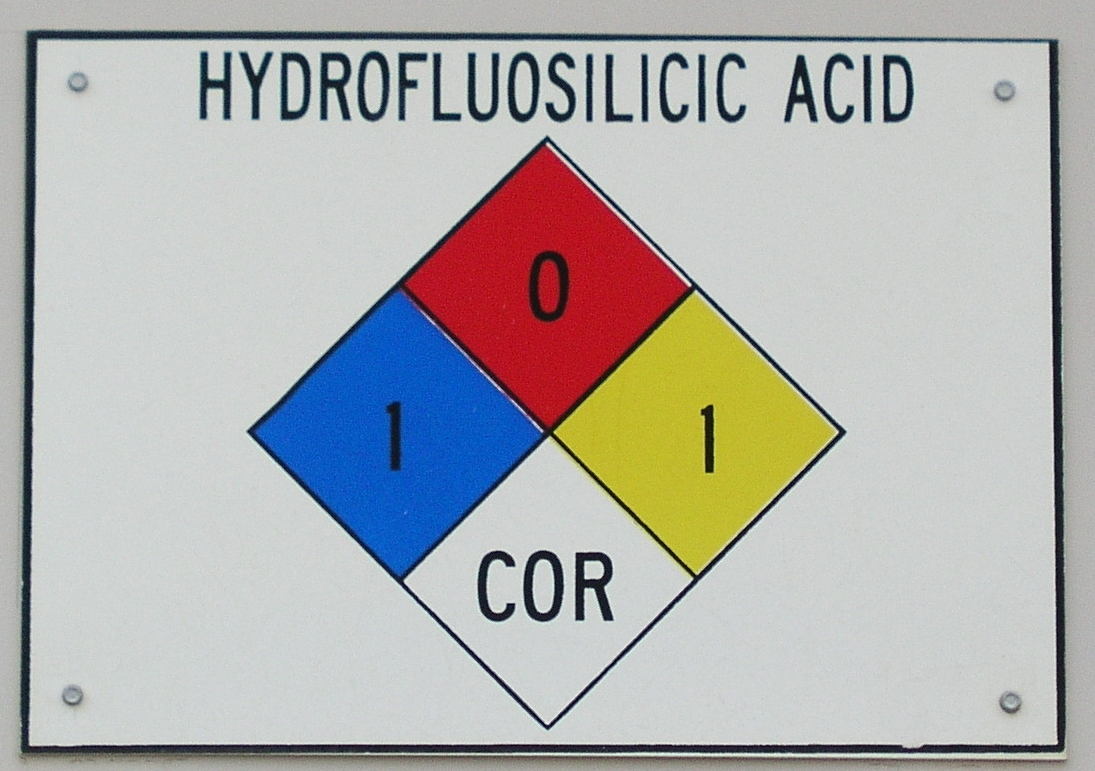
NFPA 704 placard of hydrofluosilicic acid. Notably, it is using the nonstandard COR sign.

The development of NFPA 704 is credited to the Charlotte Fire Department after a fire at the Charlotte Chemical Company in 1959 led to severe injuries to many of the firefighters. Upon arrival, the fire crew found a fire burning inside a vat that firefighters assumed to be burning kerosene. The crew tried to suppress the fire, which resulted in the vat exploding due to metallic sodium being stored in the vat. Thirteen firefighters were injured, several of whom had critical injuries while one lost both ears and most of his face from the incident.

At the time, such vats were not labelled with the materials they contained, so firefighters did not have the necessary information to recognize that hazardous materials were present, which required a specific response. In this case, sodium was able to react with water to release hydrogen gas and large amounts of heat, which has the potential to explode.

The Charlotte Fire Department developed training to respond to fires involving hazardous materials, ensured that protective clothing was available to those responding, and expanded the fire prevention inspection program. Fire Marshal J. F. Morris developed the diamond shaped placard as a marking system to indicate when a building contained hazardous materials, with their levels of flammability, reactivity and health effects.

== See also ==
- Globally Harmonized System of Classification and Labeling of Chemicals
- GHS hazard pictograms
- Hazard symbol
- Hazchem
- Hazmat
- HMIS Color Bar
