= Dangerous goods =

Substances harmful to people, property or the environment

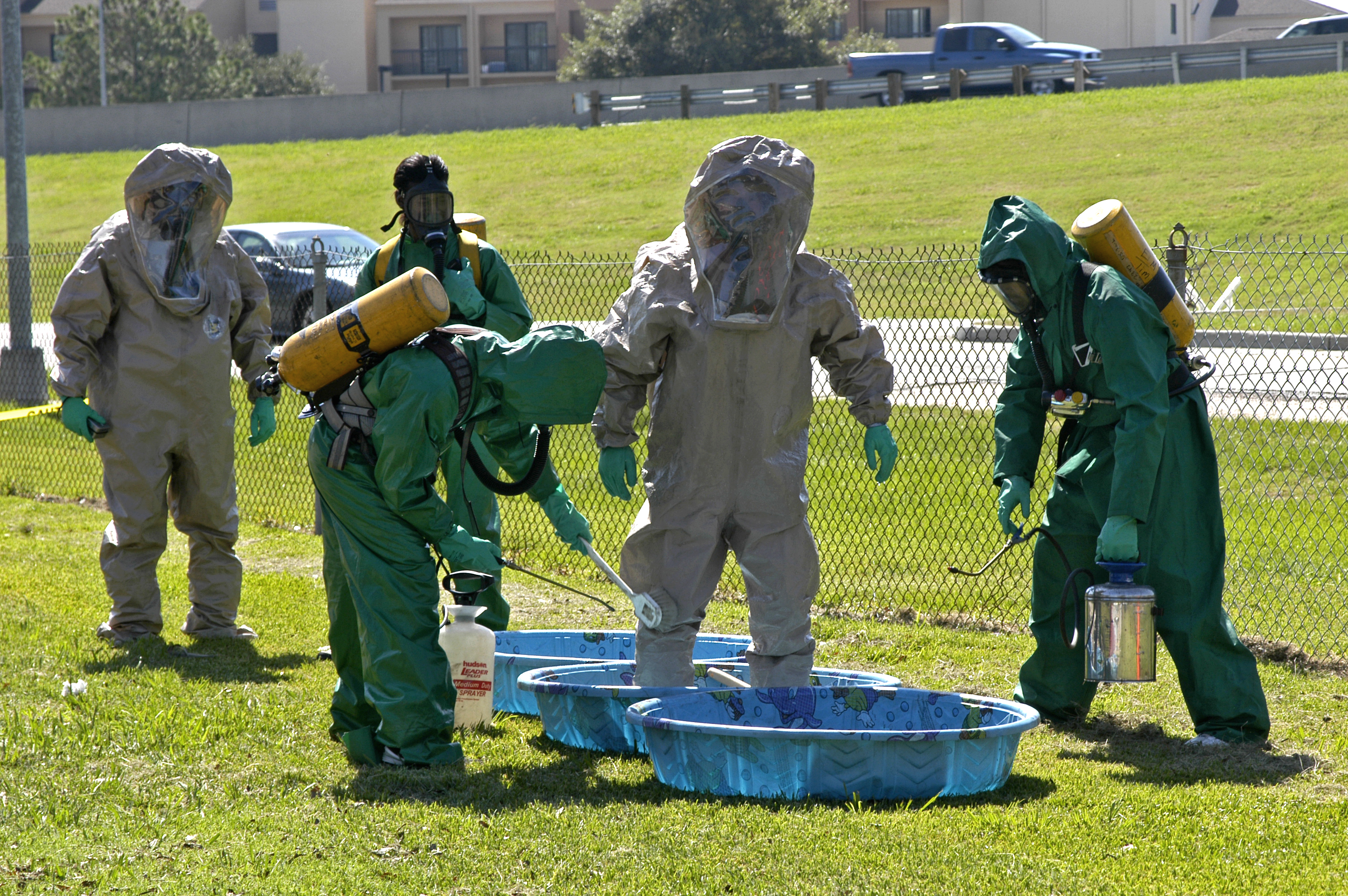
An emergency medical technician team training as rescue (grey suits) and decontamination (green suits) respondents to hazardous material and toxic contamination situations

The pictogram for poisonous substances of the Globally Harmonized System of Classification and Labelling of Chemicals

Dangerous goods are substances that are a risk to health, safety, property or the environment during transport. Certain dangerous goods that pose risks even when not being transported are known as hazardous materials (syllabically abbreviated as HAZMAT or hazmat). An example of dangerous goods is hazardous waste which is waste that threatens public health or the environment.

Hazardous materials are often subject to chemical regulations. Hazmat teams are personnel specially trained to handle dangerous goods, which include materials that are radioactive, flammable, explosive, corrosive, oxidizing, asphyxiating, biohazardous, toxic, poisonous, pathogenic, or allergenic. Also included are physical conditions such as compressed gases and liquids or hot materials, including all goods containing such materials or chemicals, or may have other characteristics that render them hazardous in specific circumstances.

Dangerous goods are often indicated by diamond-shaped signage on the item (see NFPA 704), its container, or the building where it is stored. The color of each diamond indicates its hazard, e.g., flammable is indicated with red, because fire and heat are generally of red color, and explosive is indicated with orange, because mixing red (flammable) with yellow (oxidizing agent) creates orange. A nonflammable and nontoxic gas is indicated with green, because all compressed air vessels were this color in France after World War II, and France was where the diamond system of hazmat identification originated.

== Global regulations ==
The most widely applied regulatory scheme is that for the transportation of dangerous goods. The United Nations Economic and Social Council issues the UN Recommendations on the Transport of Dangerous Goods, which form the basis for most regional, national, and international regulatory schemes. For instance, the International Civil Aviation Organization has developed dangerous goods regulations for air transport of hazardous materials that are based upon the UN model but modified to accommodate unique aspects of air transport. Individual airline and governmental requirements are incorporated with this by the International Air Transport Association to produce the widely used IATA Dangerous Goods Regulations (DGR). Similarly, the International Maritime Organization (IMO) has developed the International Maritime Dangerous Goods Code ("IMDG Code", part of the International Convention for the Safety of Life at Sea) for transportation of dangerous goods by sea. IMO member countries have also developed the HNS Convention to provide compensation in case of dangerous goods spills in the sea.

The Intergovernmental Organisation for International Carriage by Rail has developed the regulations concerning the International Carriage of Dangerous Goods by Rail ("RID", part of the Convention concerning International Carriage by Rail). Many individual nations have also structured their dangerous goods transportation regulations to harmonize with the UN model in organization as well as in specific requirements.

The Globally Harmonized System of Classification and Labelling of Chemicals (GHS) is an internationally agreed upon system set to replace the various classification and labeling standards used in different countries. The GHS uses consistent criteria for classification and labeling on a global level.

=== UN numbers and proper shipping names ===
Dangerous goods are assigned to UN numbers and proper shipping names according to their hazard classification and their composition. Dangerous goods commonly carried are listed in the Dangerous Goods list.

Examples for UN numbers and proper shipping names are:

- 1202 GAS OIL or DIESEL FUEL or HEATING OIL, LIGHT
- 1203 MOTOR SPIRIT or GASOLINE or PETROL
- 3090 LITHIUM METAL BATTERIES
- 3480 LITHIUM ION BATTERIES including lithium ion polymer batteries

== Classification and labeling summary tables ==
Dangerous goods are divided into nine classes (in addition to several subcategories) on the basis of the specific chemical characteristics producing the risk.

Note: The graphics and text in this article representing the dangerous goods safety marks are derived from the United Nations-based system of identifying dangerous goods. Not all countries use precisely the same graphics (label, placard or text information) in their national regulations. Some use graphic symbols, but without English wording or with similar wording in their national language. Refer to the dangerous goods transportation regulations of the country of interest.

For example, see the TDG Bulletin: Dangerous Goods Safety Marks based on the Canadian Transportation of Dangerous Goods Regulations.

The statement above applies equally to all the dangerous goods classes discussed in this article.

Class 1: Explosives
Information on this graphic changes depending on which, "Division" of explosive is shipped. Explosive Dangerous Goods have compatibility group letters assigned to facilitate segregation during transport. The letters used range from A to S excluding the letters I, M, O, P, Q and R. The example above shows an explosive with a compatibility group "A" (shown as 1.1A). The actual letter shown would depend on the specific properties of the substance being transported. For example, the Canadian Transportation of Dangerous Goods Regulations provides a description of compatibility groups.: 1.1 Explosives with a mass explosion hazard; Ex: TNT, dynamite, nitroglycerine.; 1.2 Explosives with a severe projection hazard.; 1.3 Explosives with a fire, blast or projection hazard but not a mass explosion hazard.; 1.4 Minor fire or projection hazard (includes ammunition and most consumer fireworks).; 1.5 An insensitive substance with a mass explosion hazard (explosion similar to 1.1); 1.6 Extremely insensitive articles.; The United States Department of Transportation (DOT) regulates hazmat transportation within the territory of the US. 1.1 — Explosives with a mass explosion hazard. (nitroglycerin/dynamite, ANFO) 1.2 — Explosives with a blast/projection hazard. 1.3 — Explosives with a minor blast hazard. (rocket propellant, display fireworks) 1.4 — Explosives with a major fire hazard. (consumer fireworks, ammunition) 1.5 — Blasting agents. 1.6 — Extremely insensitive explosives.
| Hazardous Materials; Class 1: Explosives | Hazardous Materials; Class 1.1: Explosives Mass Explosion Hazard | Hazardous Materials; Class 1.2: Explosives Blast/Projection Hazard |
| Hazardous Materials; Class 1.3: Explosives Minor Blast Hazard | Hazardous Materials; Class 1.4: Explosives Major Fire Hazard | Hazardous Materials; Class 1.5: Blasting Agents Blasting Agents |
| | Hazardous Materials; Class 1.6: Explosives Extremely Insensitive Explosives | |
Class 2: Gases
Gases which are compressed, liquefied or dissolved under pressure as detailed below. Some gases have subsidiary risk classes; poisonous or corrosive.: 2.1 Flammable Gas: Gases which ignite on contact with an ignition source, such as acetylene, hydrogen, and propane.; 2.2 Non-Flammable Gases: Gases which are neither flammable nor poisonous. Includes the cryogenic gases/liquids (temperatures of below -100 °C) used for cryopreservation and rocket fuels, such as nitrogen, neon, and carbon dioxide.; 2.3 Poisonous Gases: Gases liable to cause death or serious injury to human health if inhaled; examples are fluorine, chlorine, and hydrogen cyanide.
| Hazardous Materials; Class 2.1: Flammable Gas | Hazardous Materials; Class 2.2: Nonflammable Gas | Hazardous Materials; Class 2.3: Poisonous Gas |
| Hazardous Materials; Class 2.2: Oxygen (Alternative Placard) | Hazardous Materials; Class 2.3: Inhalation Hazard (Alternative Placard) | |
Class 3: Flammable Liquids
Flammable liquids included in Class 3 are included in one of the following packing groups: Packing Group I, if they have an initial boiling point of 35°C or less at an absolute pressure of 101.3 kPa and any flash point, such as diethyl ether or carbon disulfide; Packing Group II, if they have an initial boiling point greater than 35°C at an absolute pressure of 101.3 kPa and a flash point less than 23°C, such as gasoline (petrol) and acetone; or; Packing Group III, if the criteria for inclusion in Packing Group I or II are not met, such as kerosene and diesel.; Note: For further details, check the Dangerous Goods Transportation Regulations of the country of interest.
| Hazardous Materials; Class 3: Flammable Liquids | Hazardous Materials; Class 3: Combustible (Alternate Placard) | Hazardous Materials; Class 3: Fuel Oil (Alternate Placard) |
| | Hazardous Materials; Class 3: Gasoline (Alternate Placard) | |
Class 4: Flammable Solids
| Hazardous Materials; Class 4.1: Flammable Solids 4.1 Flammable Solids: Solid substances that are easily ignited and readily combustible (nitrocellulose, magnesium, safety or strike-anywhere matches). | Hazardous Materials; Class 4.2: Spontaneously Combustible Solids 4.2 Spontaneously Combustible: Solid substances that ignite spontaneously (aluminium alkyls, white phosphorus). | Hazardous Materials; Class 4.3: Dangerous when Wet 4.3 Dangerous when Wet: Solid substances that emit a flammable gas when wet or react violently with water (sodium, calcium, potassium, calcium carbide). |
Class 5: Oxidizing Agents and Organic Peroxides
| Hazardous Materials; Class 5.1: Oxidizing Agent 5.1 Oxidizing agents other than organic peroxides (calcium hypochlorite, ammonium nitrate, hydrogen peroxide, potassium permanganate). | Hazardous Materials; Class 5.2: Organic Peroxide Oxidizing Agent 5.2 Organic peroxides, either in liquid or solid form (benzoyl peroxides, cumene hydroperoxide). | |
Class 6: Toxic and Infectious Substances
| Hazardous Materials; Class 6.1: Poison: 6.1a Toxic substances which are liable to cause death or serious injury to human health if inhaled, swallowed or by skin absorption (potassium cyanide, mercuric chloride).; 6.1b (Now PGIII) Toxic substances which are harmful to human health (N.B this symbol is no longer authorized by the United Nations) (pesticides, methylene chloride). | Hazardous Materials; Class 6.2: Biohazard: 6.2 Biohazardous substances; the World Health Organization (WHO) divides this class into two categories: Category A: Infectious; and Category B: Samples (virus cultures, pathology specimens, used intravenous needles). | |
| Class 7: Radioactive Substances | Class 8: Corrosive Substances | Class 9: Miscellaneous |
| Hazardous Materials; Class 7: Radioactive Radioactive substances comprise substances or a combination of substances which emit ionizing radiation (uranium, plutonium). | Hazardous Materials; Class 8: Corrosive Corrosive substances are substances that can dissolve organic tissue or severely corrode certain metals: 8.1 Acids: sulfuric acid, hydrochloric acid; 8.2 Alkalis: potassium hydroxide, sodium hydroxide | Hazardous Materials; Class 9: Miscellaneous Hazardous substances that do not fall into the other categories (asbestos, air-bag inflators, self inflating life rafts, dry ice). |

== Handling and transportation ==
=== Handling ===
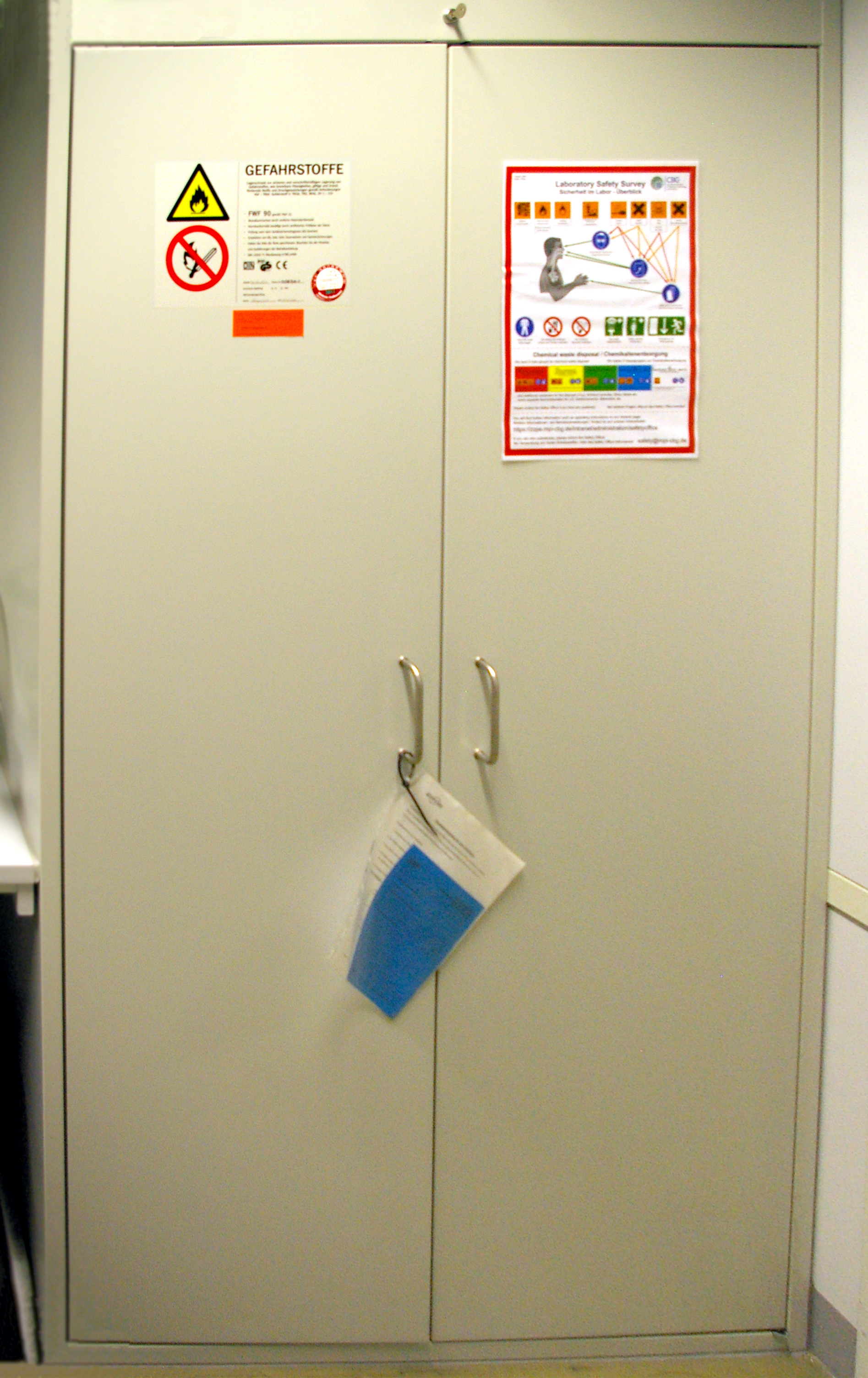
A reinforced, fireproof cabinet for dangerous chemicals

Mitigating the risks associated with hazardous materials may require the application of safety precautions during their transport, use, storage and disposal. Most countries regulate hazardous materials by law, and they are subject to several international treaties as well. Even so, different countries may use different class diamonds for the same product. For example, in Australia, anhydrous ammonia UN 1005 is classified as 2.3 (toxic gas) with subsidiary hazard 8 (corrosive), whereas in the U.S. it is only classified as 2.2 (non-flammable gas).

People who handle dangerous goods will often wear protective equipment, and metropolitan fire departments often have a response team specifically trained to deal with accidents and spills. Persons who may come into contact with dangerous goods as part of their work are also often subject to monitoring or health surveillance to ensure that their exposure does not exceed occupational exposure limits.

Laws and regulations on the use and handling of hazardous materials may differ depending on the activity and status of the material. For example, one set of requirements may apply to their use in the workplace while a different set of requirements may apply to spill response, sale for consumer use, or transportation. Most countries regulate some aspect of hazardous materials.

=== Packing groups ===
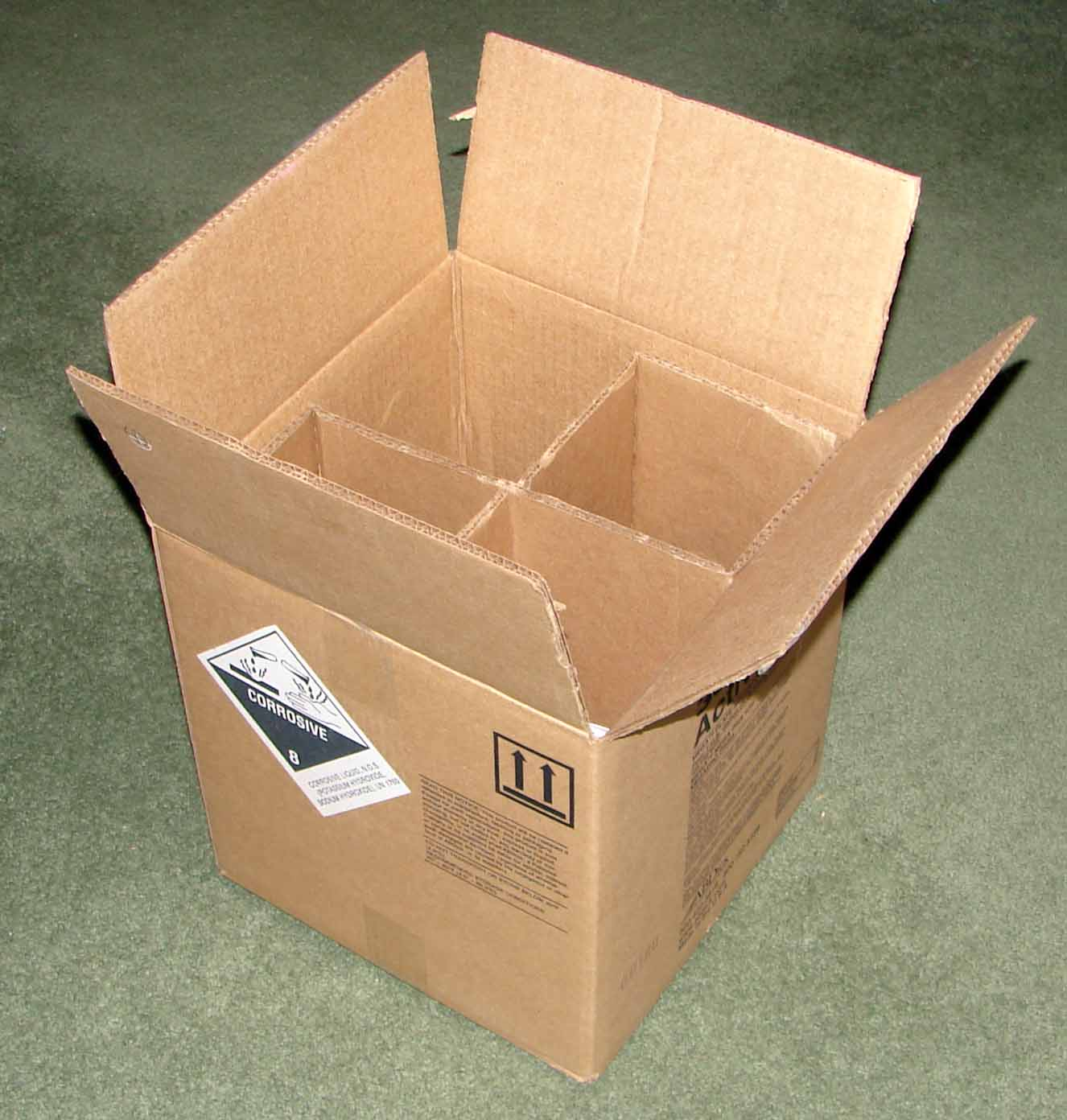
Doublewall corrugated fiberboard box with dividers for shipping four bottles of corrosive liquid, UN 4G, certified performance for Packing Group III

Packing groups are used for the purpose of determining the degree of protective packaging required for dangerous goods during transportation.

- Group I: great danger, and most protective packaging required. Some combinations of different classes of dangerous goods on the same vehicle or in the same container are forbidden if one of the goods is Group I.
- Group II: medium danger
- Group III: minor danger among regulated goods, and least protective packaging within the transportation requirement

=== Transport documents ===
One of the transport regulations is that, as an assistance during emergency situations, written instructions how to deal in such need to be carried and easily accessible in the driver's cabin.

Dangerous goods shipments also require a dangerous goods transport document prepared by the shipper. The information that is generally required includes the shipper's name and address; the consignee's name and address; descriptions of each of the dangerous goods, along with their quantity, classification, and packaging; and emergency contact information. Common formats include the one issued by the International Air Transport Association (IATA) for air shipments and the form by the International Maritime Organization (IMO) for sea cargo.

=== Training ===
A license or permit card for hazmat training must be presented when requested by officials.

== Society and culture ==
=== Global goals ===
The international community has defined the responsible management of hazardous waste and chemicals as an important part of sustainable development with Sustainable Development Goal 3. Target 3.9 has this target with respect to hazardous chemicals: "By 2030, substantially reduce the number of deaths and illnesses from hazardous chemicals and air, water and soil pollution and contamination." Furthermore, Sustainable Development Goal 6 also mentions hazardous materials in Target 6.3: "By 2030, improve water quality by reducing pollution, eliminating dumping and minimizing release of hazardous chemicals and materials [...]."

== By country or region ==
=== Australia ===
The Australian Dangerous Goods Code complies with international standards of importation and exportation of dangerous goods in line with the UN Recommendations on the Transport of Dangerous Goods. Australia uses the standard international UN numbers with a few slightly different signs on the back, front and sides of vehicles carrying hazardous substances. The country uses the same "Hazchem" code system as the UK to provide advisory information to emergency services personnel in the event of an emergency.

=== Canada ===
Transportation of dangerous goods (hazardous materials) in Canada by road is normally a provincial jurisdiction. The federal government has jurisdiction over air, most marine, and most rail transport. The federal government acting centrally created the federal Transportation of Dangerous Goods Act and regulations, which provinces adopted in whole or in part via provincial transportation of dangerous goods legislation. The result is that all provinces use the federal regulations as their standard within their province; some small variances can exist because of provincial legislation. Creation of the federal regulations was coordinated by Transport Canada. Hazard classifications are based upon the UN model.

Outside of federal facilities, labour standards are generally under the jurisdiction of individual provinces and territories. However, communication about hazardous materials in the workplace has been standardized across the country through Health Canada's Workplace Hazardous Materials Information System (WHMIS).

=== Europe ===
The European Union has passed numerous directives and regulations to avoid the dissemination and restrict the usage of hazardous substances, important ones being the Restriction of Hazardous Substances Directive (RoHS) and the REACH regulation. There are also long-standing European treaties such as ADR, ADN and RID that regulate the transportation of hazardous materials by road, rail, river and inland waterways, following the guide of the UN model regulations.

European Union law distinguishes clearly between the law of dangerous goods and the law of hazardous materials. The first refers primarily to the transport of the respective goods including the interim storage, if caused by the transport. The latter describes the requirements of storage (including warehousing) and usage of hazardous materials. This distinction is important because different directives and orders of European law are applied.

==== United Kingdom ====
The United Kingdom (as well as Australia, Malaysia, and New Zealand) uses the Hazchem warning plate system which carries information on how an emergency service should deal with an incident. The Dangerous Goods Emergency Action Code List (EAC) lists dangerous goods; it is reviewed every two years and is an essential compliance document for all emergency services, local government and for those who may control the planning for, and prevention of, emergencies involving dangerous goods. The latest 2025 version is available from the National Chemical Emergency Centre (NCEC) website. Guidance is available from the Health and Safety Executive.

=== New Zealand ===
New Zealand's Land Transport Rule: Dangerous Goods 2005 and the Dangerous Goods Amendment 2010 describe the rules applied to the transportation of hazardous and dangerous goods in New Zealand. The system closely follows the United Nations Recommendations on the Transport of Dangerous Goods and uses placards with Hazchem codes and UN numbers on packaging and the transporting vehicle's exterior to convey information to emergency services personnel.

Drivers that carry dangerous goods commercially, or carry quantities in excess of the rule's guidelines must obtain a D (dangerous goods) endorsement on their driver's licence. Drivers carrying quantities of goods under the rule's guidelines and for recreational or domestic purposes do not need any special endorsements.

=== United States ===
A picture of the U.S. DOT classes in use

Due to the increase in fear of terrorism in the early 21st century after the September 11, 2001, attacks, funding for greater hazmat-handling capabilities was increased throughout the United States, recognizing that flammable, poisonous, explosive, or radioactive substances in particular could be used for terrorist attacks.

The Pipeline and Hazardous Materials Safety Administration regulates hazmat transportation within the territory of the US by Title 49 of the Code of Federal Regulations.

The U.S. Occupational Safety and Health Administration (OSHA) regulates the handling of hazardous materials in the workplace as well as response to hazardous-materials-related incidents, most notably through Hazardous Waste Operations and Emergency Response (HAZWOPER). regulations found at 29 CFR 1910.120.

In 1984 the agencies OSHA, EPA, USCG, and NIOSH jointly published the first Hazardous Waste Operations and Emergency Response Guidance Manual which is available for download.

The Environmental Protection Agency (EPA) regulates hazardous materials as they may impact the community and environment, including specific regulations for environmental cleanup and for handling and disposal of waste hazardous materials. For instance, transportation of hazardous materials is regulated by the Hazardous Materials Transportation Act. The Resource Conservation and Recovery Act and analogous state laws were also passed to further protect human and environmental health.

The Consumer Product Safety Commission regulates hazardous materials that may be used in products sold for household and other consumer uses.

==== Hazard classes for materials in transport ====
Following the UN model, the DOT divides regulated hazardous materials into nine classes, some of which are further subdivided. Hazardous materials in transportation must be placarded and have specified packaging and labelling. Some materials must always be placarded, others may only require placarding in certain circumstances.

Trailers of goods in transport are usually marked with a four digit UN number. This number, along with standardized logs of hazmat information, can be referenced by first responders (firefighters, police officers, and ambulance personnel) who can find information about the material in the Emergency Response Guidebook.

==== Fixed facilities ====
Different standards usually apply for handling and marking hazmats at fixed facilities, including NFPA 704 diamond markings (a consensus standard often adopted by local governmental jurisdictions), OSHA regulations requiring chemical safety information for employees, and CPSC requirements requiring informative labeling for the public, as well as wearing hazmat suits when handling hazardous materials.

== See also ==
- ADR (treaty) – international arrangements for carriage of dangerous goods
- Agency for Toxic Substances and Disease Registry (ATSDR)
- Area classification
- ASTM International – an international standards organization
- CLP Regulation
- Dangerous Goods Safety Advisor
- Directive 67/548/EEC
- Environmental hazard
- Hazardous materials apparatus
- UN number
- Hazchem
- Highly hazardous chemical
- List of Extremely Hazardous Substances
- List of UN Numbers
- National Fire Protection Association (NFPA) standard 704 (US) (the "fire diamond")
- Packing group
- Pipe marking
- Poison control center
- Redundant refrigeration system
- Salvage drum
- Spill pallet
- Waste oil
