= HAZMAT Class 5 Oxidizing agents and organic peroxides =

An oxidizer is a chemical that readily yields oxygen in reactions, thereby causing or enhancing combustion.

== Divisions ==
=== Division 5.1: Oxidizers ===
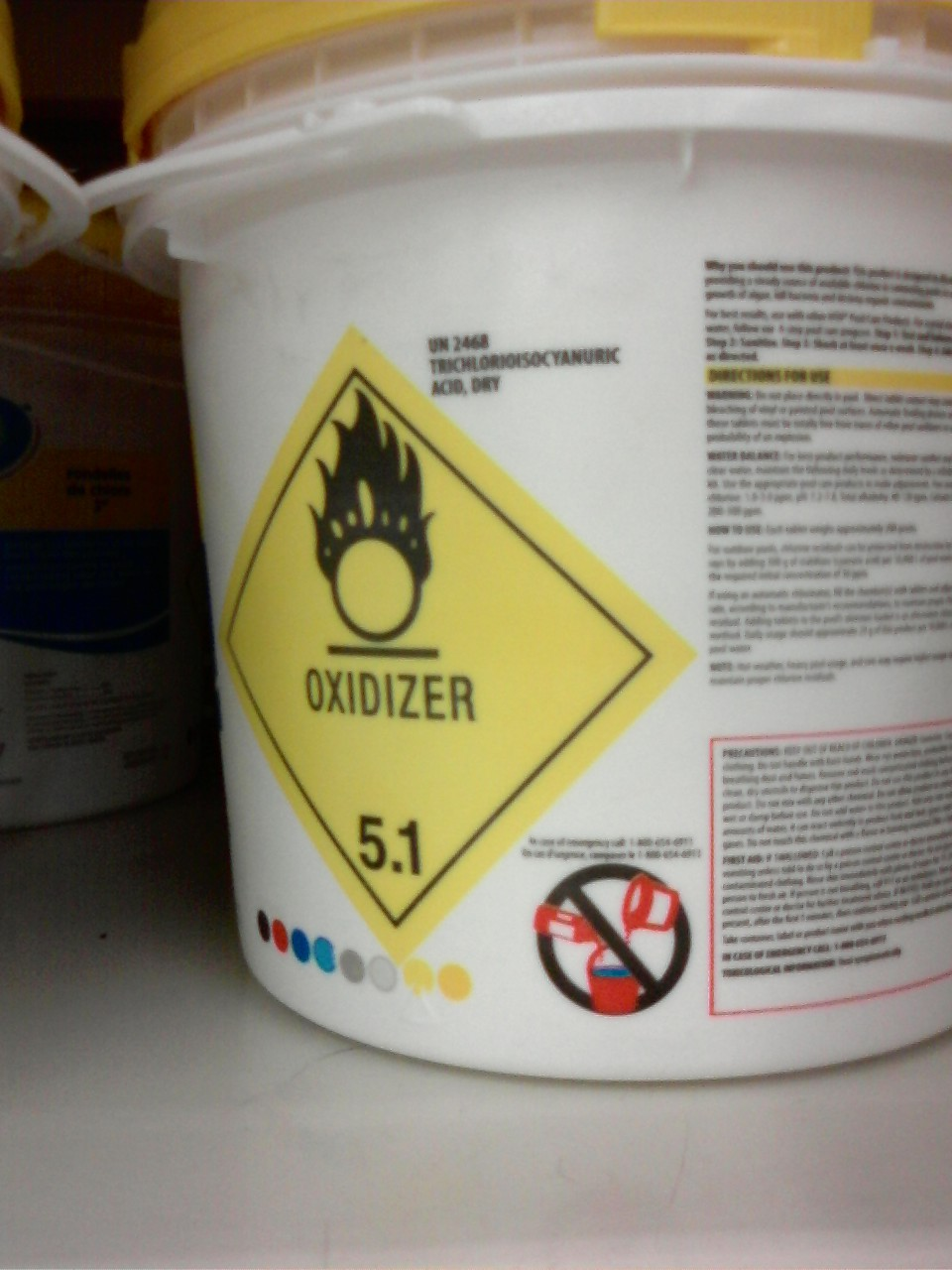
HAZMAT 5.1 placard on a pail of UN 2468,Trichloroisocyanuric acid for use in swimming pools.

An oxidizer is a material that may, generally by yielding oxygen, cause or enhance the combustion of other materials.

1. A solid material is classed as a Division 5.1 material if, when tested in accordance with the UN Manual of Tests and Criteria, its mean burning time is less than or equal to the burning time of a 3:7 potassium bromate/cellulose mixture.
2. A liquid material is classed as a Division 5.1 material if, when tested in accordance with the UN Manual of Tests and Criteria, it spontaneously ignites or its mean time for a pressure rise from 690 kPa to 2070 kPa gauge is less than the time of a 1:1 nitric acid (65 percent)/cellulose mixture.

=== Division 5.2: Organic Peroxides ===
An organic peroxide is any organic compound containing oxygen (O) in the bivalent -O-O- structure and which may be considered a derivative of hydrogen peroxide, where one or more of the hydrogen atoms have been replaced by organic radicals, unless any of the following paragraphs applies:

1. The material meets the definition of an explosive as prescribed in subpart C of this part, in which case it must be classed as an explosive (applies to acetone peroxide, for example)
2. The material is forbidden from being offered for transportation according to 49CFR 172.101 of this subchapter or 49CFR 173.21;
3. The Associate Administrator for Hazardous Materials Safety has determined that the material does not present a hazard which is associated with a Division 5.2 material; or
4. The material meets one of the following conditions:

- For materials containing no more than 1.0 percent hydrogen peroxide, the available oxygen, as calculated using the equation in paragraph (a)(4)(ii) of this section, is not more than 1.0 percent, or
- For materials containing more than 1.0 percent but not more than 7.0 percent hydrogen peroxide, the available oxygen content (O_{a}) is not more than 0.5 percent, when determined using the equation:

O_{a} = 16x $\sum_{i=1}^k \frac {n_{i}c_{i}}{m_{i}}$

where for a material containing k species of organic peroxides:

$n_{i}$ = number of -O-O- groups per molecule of the $i^{th}$ species
$c_{i}$ = concentration (mass percent) of the $i^{th}$ species
$m_{i}$ = molecular mass of the $i^{th}$ species

== Placards ==
Hazardous Materials; Class 5.1: Oxidizing Agent	Hazardous Materials; Class 5.2: Organic Peroxide Oxidizing Agent

Prior to 2007, the placard for 'Organic Peroxide' (5.2) was entirely yellow, like placard 5.1.

== Compatibility Table ==
Load and Segregation Chart
	Weight		1.1	1.2	1.3	1.4	1.5	1.6	2.1	2.2	2.2	2.3		3	4.1	4.2	4.3	5.1	5.2	6.1	7	8
	Weight		1.1	1.2	1.3	1.4	1.5	1.6	2.1	2.2	2.2	A	B	3	4.1	4.2	4.3	5.1	5.2	A	7	8
5.1	1,001 lb (454 kg)	A	No	No	No		No					No	O	O						No		O
5.2	1,001 lb (454 kg)		No	No	No		No					No	O							No		O
Key
The absence of any hazard class or division or a blank space in the table indicates that no restrictions apply.: X: These materials may not be loaded, transported, or stored together in the same transport vehicle or storage facility during the course of transportation.; O: Indicates that these materials may not be loaded, transported or stored together in the same transport vehicle or storage facility during the course of transportation, unless separated in a manner that, in the event of leakage from packages under conditions normally incident to transportation, commingling of hazardous materials would not occur.; A: This note means that, notwithstanding the requirements of the letter 'X', ammonium nitrate fertilizer may be loaded or stored with Division 1.1 or Division 1.5 materials.; Source: United States Code of Federal Regulations, Title 49 CFR §177.848 - Segregation of hazardous materials.

== Packing Groups ==
Class 5 Packing Groups
Group	Division	Phase	Details
Group I	5.1	Solid	Any material which, in either concentration tested, exhibits a mean burning time less than the mean burning time of a 3:2 potassium bromate/cellulose mixture.
Group II	5.1	Solid	Any material which, in either concentration tested, exhibits a mean burning time less than or equal to the mean burning time of a 2:3 potassium bromate/cellulose mixture and the criteria for Packing Group I are not met.
Group III	5.1	Solid	Any material which, in either concentration tested, exhibits a mean burning time less than or equal to the mean burning time of a 3:7 potassium bromate/cellulose mixture and the criteria for Packing Group I and II are not met.
Group I	5.1	Liquid	1. Any material which spontaneously ignites when mixed with cellulose in a 1:1 ratio; or 2. Any material which exhibits a mean pressure rise time less than the pressure rise time of a 1:1 perchloric acid (50 percent)/cellulose mixture.
Group II	5.1	Liquid	Any material which exhibits a mean pressure rise time less than or equal to the pressure rise time of a 1:1 aqueous sodium chlorate solution(40 percent)/cellulose mixture and the criteria for Group I are not met.
Group III	5.1	Liquid	Any material which exhibits a mean pressure rise time less than or equal to the pressure rise time of a 1:1 nitric acid (65 percent)/cellulose mixture and the criteria for Packing Group I and II are not met.
Group II	5.2	All	All Division 5.2 materials do not have a packing group in Column 5 of the 49 CFR 172.101 Table.
