= Hazardous Materials Transportation Act =

Federal law in the United States

- Long title: Hazardous Materials Transportation Act of 1975
- Acronyms (colloquial): HMTA
- Enacted by: the 93rd United States Congress
- Effective: January 3, 1975

Citations
- Public law: P.L. 93-633
- Statutes at Large: 88 Stat. 2156

Codification
- Acts amended: Hazardous Material Transportation Control Act of 1970
- Titles amended: 49 (Transportation)
- U.S.C. sections created: 49 U.S.C. §§ 5101–5127

Legislative history
- Signed into law by President Gerald Ford on January 3, 1975

Major amendments
- The Hazardous Materials Transportation Uniform Safety Act of 1990; Hazardous Materials Transportation Authorization Act of 1994

The Hazardous Materials Transportation Act (HMTA), enacted in 1975, is the principal federal law in the United States regulating the transportation of hazardous materials. Its purpose is to "protect against the risks to life, property, and the environment that are inherent in the transportation of hazardous material in intrastate, interstate, and foreign commerce" under the authority of the United States Secretary of Transportation.

The Act was passed as a means to improve the uniformity of existing regulations for transporting hazardous materials and to prevent spills and illegal dumping endangering the public and the environment, a problem exacerbated by uncoordinated and fragmented regulations. Regulations are enforced through four key provisions encompassing federal standards under Title 49 of the United States Code:

- Procedures and policies
- Material designations & labeling
- Packaging requirements
- Operational rules

Violation of the HMTA regulations can result in civil or criminal penalties, unless a special permit is granted under the discretion of the Secretary of Transportation.

== Background ==
=== History ===
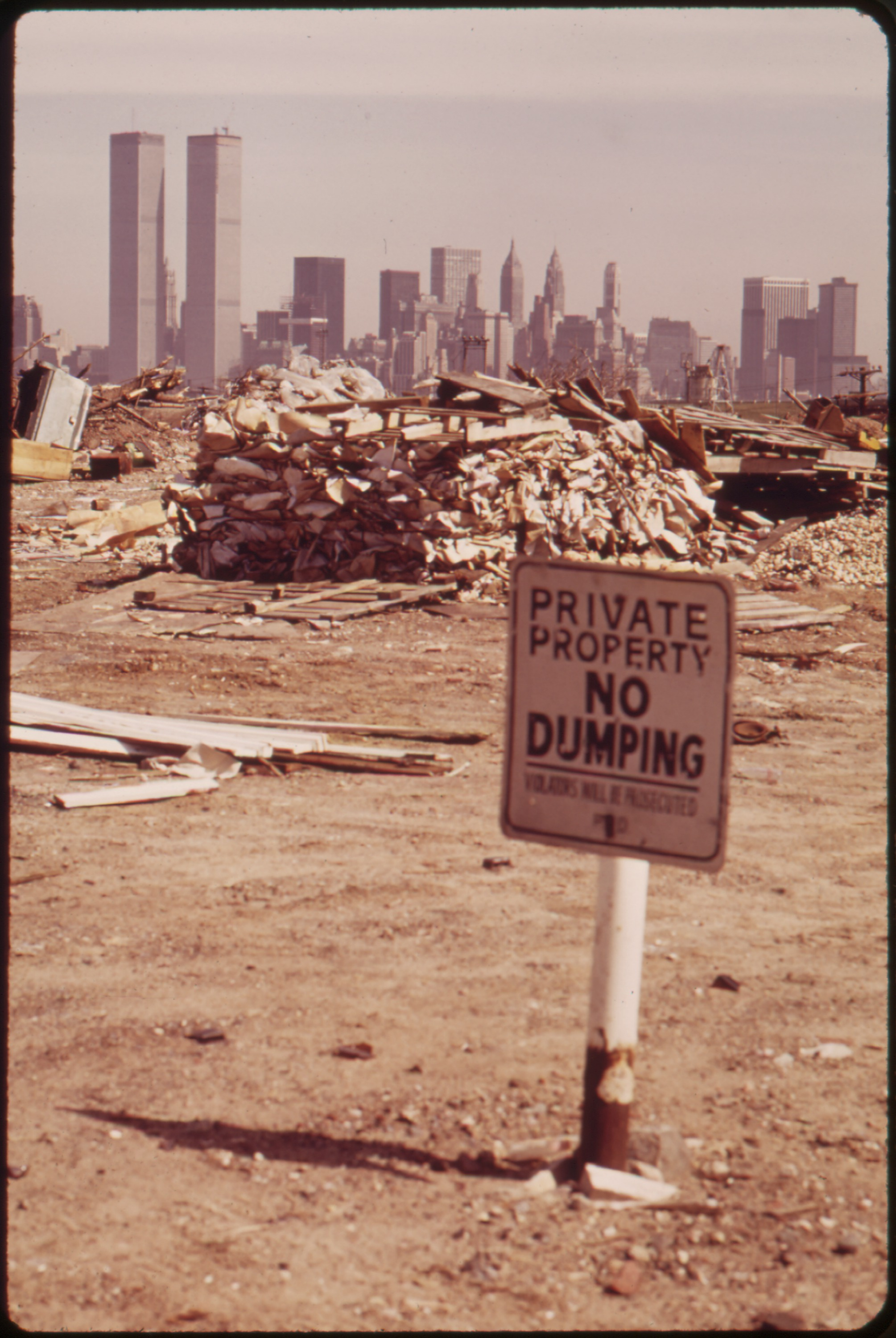
Illegal dumping in an area just off the New Jersey Turnpike.

In the 1970s, landfills throughout the United States began to refuse the acceptance of hazardous wastes for the protection of property, the environment, and liability from what would later become known as Superfund sites, which dramatically increased the cost of disposal. The high cost of disposal led to increased dumping of materials that were increasingly being deemed "hazardous" by the public and government. Illegal dumping took place on vacant lots, along highways, or on the actual highways themselves. At the same time, increased accidents and incidents with hazardous materials during transportation was a growing problem, causing damage to property and the environment, injury, and death. At the time, the U.S. Department of Transportation estimated that 75% of all hazardous waste shipments violated existing regulations due to a lack of inspection personnel and poor coordination among the U.S. Coast Guard, the Federal Aviation Administration, the Federal Highway Administration, and the Federal Railroad Administration. The increasing frequency of illegal "midnight" dumping and spills, along with the already existing inconsistent regulations and fragmented enforcement, led to the passing of the Hazardous Materials Transportation Act. It was signed into law on January 3, 1975 by President Gerald Ford, as a means to strengthen the Hazardous Materials Transportation Control Act of 1970 and unify existing regulations.

Since its passage, the HMTA has had two major amendments:

- the Hazardous Materials Transportation Uniform Safety Act (1990) and
- the Hazardous Materials Transportation Authorization Act (1994).

=== Importance ===
It is estimated that the United States alone makes over 500,000 shipments of hazardous materials every day. More than 90% of these shipments are transported by truck, and anywhere from 5–15% of those trucks are carrying hazardous materials regulated under the HMTA. Approximately 50% of those materials are corrosive or flammable petroleum products, while the remaining shipments represent any of the 2,700 other chemicals considered hazardous in interstate commerce. Accidents that occurred in the transportation of hazardous materials resulted in injury, death, and the destruction of property and the environment. However, the accidents were not limited to the road. The number of incidents regarding hazardous wastes was second in railway accidents behind road accidents. The passage of the HMTA (and its subsequent amendments) has significantly reduced the number of incidents and the gravity of those incidents with hazardous materials in transportation.

=== Regulatory role ===
The HMTA is one of the eight laws defining the EPA's Emergency Management Program. The other laws comprising the Emergency Management Program include the Clean Air Act (CAA), the Clean Water Act (CWA), the Oil Pollution Act (OPA), the Comprehensive Environmental Response, Compensation, and Liability Act (CERCLA), Superfund Amendments and Reauthorization Act (SARA), the Emergency Planning and Community Right-to-Know Act (EPCRA), and the Chemical Safety Information, Site Security and Fuels Regulatory Relief Act (CSISSFRRA).

The primary objective of the HMTA is to protect "life, property, and the environment" from the inherent risks of transporting hazardous material, in all major modes of commerce, by improving the regulation and enforcement authority of the Secretary of Transportation. It is in the Secretary's authority to designate material or a group or class of material as hazardous when they meet the definition of hazardous material under the Act.

A hazardous material, as defined by the Secretary, is any particular quantity or form of a material that may pose an unreasonable risk to health and safety or property during transportation in commerce. This includes materials that are explosive, radioactive, infectious, flammable, toxic, oxidizing, or corrosive.

Hazardous wastes and hazardous substances are designated by the U.S. Environmental Protection Agency (EPA). Hazardous wastes are designated under the EPA's Resource Conservation and Recovery Act, while hazardous substances are designated by the Clean Water Act (CWA) and the Comprehensive Environmental Response, Compensation, and Liability Act (CERCLA). The HMTA regulates all essential modes of transportation due to the dangers hazardous materials can present during shipment by ground, air, sea, or any other mode of transportation, such as through a pipeline.

==== Regulatory categories ====
Regulations under the Act are categorized into four key provisions, encompassing federal standards under Title 49 of the United States Code that guide the safe transportation of hazardous materials:

- Procedures and policies
- Material designations & labeling
- Packaging requirements
- Operational rules

==== Responsible parties ====
The HMTA specifically states that regulations apply to any person who —

- transports hazardous materials in commerce;
- causes hazardous material to be transported in commerce;
- designs, manufactures, fabricates, inspects, marks, maintains, reconditions, repairs, or tests a package, container, or packaging component that is represented, marked, certified, or sold as qualified for use in transporting hazardous material in commerce;
- prepares or accepts hazardous material for transportation in commerce;
- is responsible for the safety of transporting hazardous material in commerce;
- certifies compliance with any requirement under the Act; or
- misrepresents whether such person is engaged in any activity under the above requirements.

Essentially, all persons involved in the preparation of the transportation of hazardous materials, though the primary burden of liability falls on the shipper of the hazardous materials (the person who offers shipment). Carriers are only required to ensure that required information accompanying hazardous materials packages is immediately available to personnel who would respond to an incident or conduct a hazardous materials investigation, per the amendments enforced in the Hazardous Materials Transportation Uniform Safety Act of 1990.

==== Enforcement ====
Regulations are enforced by use of compliance orders, civil penalties, and injunctive relief, under the discretion of the Secretary of Transportation.

As the Act stands now (with its latest amendments), the Department of Transportation (DOT) is most concerned with the test conditions of packages, rather than the transportation conditions. Enforcement includes random packaging inspections by DOT inspectors at freight terminals, intermodal transfer facilities, airports, and other facilities to determine compliance with proper marking and labeling of packaging. DOT also has made it its intent to inspect manufacturing facilities, testing facilities, and shipper's facilities where manufacturing operations occur.

=== Roles of the Federal Government and States ===
As the current statute stands, the "HMTA (Section 112, 40 U.S.C. 1811) preempts state and local governmental requirements that are inconsistent with the statute, unless that requirement affords an equal or greater level of protection to the public than the HMTA requirement."

==== Enforcement agencies ====
The Hazardous Materials Transportation Act is implemented through various agencies based on the mode of transportation and the type of hazardous material being transported:

Enforcement agency	Role in HMTA
Research and Innovative Technology Administration (RITA)	Container manufacturing guidelines
Federal Motor Carrier Safety Administration (FMCSA)	Regulations for motor carriers and highway/road shippers
Federal Railroad Administration (FRA)	Regulations for rail carriers and rail shippers
Federal Aviation Administration (FAA)	Regulations for air carriers and air shippers
United States Coast Guard (USCG)	Regulations for shipment by water and the navigable water shippers (oceans, rivers, etc.)
Pipeline and Hazardous Materials Safety Administration (PHMSA)	Develops all hazmat regulations enforced by the DOT agencies, Regulations for transportation by pipeline, special permits
Department of Energy (DOE)	Regulations for radioactive materials
Atomic Energy Authority (AEA)	Regulations for radioactive materials
Nuclear Regulatory Commission (NRC)	Regulations for radioactive materials
Department of Transportation (DOT)	Umbrella that houses most modal agencies which develop or enforce regulations for hazardous materials transportation. Led by the Secretary of Transportation.
Environmental Protection Agency (EPA)	Regulations for hazardous waste (RCRA) compliance, air & water permitting, hazardous waste cleanup, and more
Occupational Safety and Health Administration (OSHA)	Regulations to protect workers from acute and chronic exposure and other hazards
National Fire Protection Association (NFPA)	Regulations for emergency response

== Special permits and exclusions ==
§5117 provides that the Secretary may "issue, modify, or terminate" a special permit authorizing a variance to regulations prescribed under §5103(b), §5104, §5110, or §5112 of the Act to a person performing the functions under §5103(b) in a way that achieves a safety level that —

(A) is at least equal to the safety required by the Act; or
(B) is consistent with the public interest and the Act, if a required safety level does not exist.

Special permits are effective for an initial period of no more than 2 years. Renewal of the special permits is granted under the Secretary's discretion upon application for the permit for successive periods of no more than 4 years each. In the case of a special permit relating to §5112, the additional period following permit renewal must be no more than 2 years each.

=== Applications ===
To apply for a special permit, the applicant must provide a safety analysis prescribed by the Secretary that justifies the special permit, and submit the application to the Administrator of the Pipeline and Hazardous Materials Safety Administration. The Secretary then must publish notice of the application in the Federal Register to give the opportunity for public review and comment.

Upon the applicant's filing of the application, the Secretary must issue, renew, or deny the application within 180 days after the first day of the month following the filing date. If more time is needed, the Secretary must publish a statement to the Federal Register addressing the reason for the delay in the Secretary's decision on the permit, along with an estimate for when the decision will be made.

The Secretary, after completing a review of the circumstance for the permit, and after providing opportunity for public comment and review, must either institute a new rule incorporating the special permit into the regulations of the Act, or publish in the Federal Register the justification for not including the special permit into the regulations.

=== Description of relevant sections for which special permits apply ===
§5103(b): Regulations for safe transportation prescribed by the Secretary for people who —

- transport hazardous material in commerce;
- causes to transport hazardous material in commerce;
- designs, inspects, repairs, or tests packages qualified for hazardous material transport;
- prepares or accepts hazardous material for transportation in commerce;
- is responsible for the safety of transporting hazardous materials in commerce; or
- certifies compliance with any requirements under the Act

§5104: Representation and tampering regulations for a package, component of a package, or packaging intended for the use of transporting hazardous material.

§5110: Shipping papers and disclosure regulations.

§5112: Highway routing of hazardous material regulations.

== Penalties ==
=== Civil penalties ===
Under §5123, a person is liable for a civil penalty of up to $75,000 for each violation of a "regulation, order, special permit or approval" of the Act that has been knowingly committed. A separate violation is considered for each day the violation, committed by a person who transports or causes the transportation of a hazardous material, continues. A person acts knowingly when —

(A) the person has knowledge of the facts regarding the violation; or
(B) the person acting in the circumstance demonstrating reasonable logic and care would have that knowledge.

Under the discretion of the Secretary, he or she may increase the penalty amount upwards to $175,000 if the violation results in the death, serious illness or injury to any person, or in substantial damage to property. Violations resulting from training activities must be at least $450.

In determining the amount of the civil penalty, the Secretary must consider —

- the nature, circumstances, extent, and gravity of the violation;
- the degree of culpability of the violator, any history of prior violations, the ability to pay, and the effect on the ability to continue to do business; and
- any other matters that justice requires.

An opportunity for a hearing must be granted to the violator, along with a written notice from the Secretary specifying the amount of the penalty.

=== Criminal penalties ===
A person is subject to a criminal penalty under §5124 if that person knowingly tampers with the labels or packages used for transporting hazardous material, or "willfully or recklessly" violates a "regulation, order, special permit, or approval" under the Act and shall be fined under Title 18 of the United States Code, imprisoned for no more than 5 years, or both. A violation under this section that results in the release of hazardous material causing bodily injury or death to any person can render a maximum prison penalty of 10 years.

Under §5104, tampering refers to the alteration, removal, destruction, or otherwise unlawful tampering of —

- a marking, label, placard, or description on a document prescribed by regulations of the Act; or
- a package, component of a package, packaging, container, motor vehicle, rail freight car, aircraft, or vessel used to transport hazardous material.

A person acts knowingly when —

(A) the person has knowledge of the facts regarding the violation; or
(B) the person acting in the circumstance demonstrating reasonable logic and care would have that knowledge.

Knowledge of the existence of a statutory regulation required by the Secretary is not considered an element of offense.

A person acts willfully when —

(A) the person has knowledge of the facts regarding the violation; and
(B) the person has knowledge that the conduct was unlawful.

A person acts recklessly when the person displays a deliberate indifference or conscious disregard to the consequences of that person's conduct.

== Key provisions ==
=== Procedures and policies ===
Procedures on proper handling and preparation for handling hazardous materials, as well as finding out information about implementing the Act (permitting procedures, registration procedures, adding a regulation into the Act, etc.), can be found under this provision.

Under §5106, the Secretary of Transportation may prescribe criteria for handling hazardous material, including—

(1) a minimum number of personnel;
(2) minimum levels of training and qualifications for personnel;
(3) the kind and frequency of inspections;
(4) equipment for detecting, warning of, and controlling risks posed by the hazardous material;
(5) specifications for the use of equipment and facilities used in handling and transporting the hazardous material; and
(6) a system of monitoring safety procedures for transporting the hazardous material.

Under §5107, the hazmat employee training requirements and grants are summarized:

(A) Training requirements— The Secretary shall prescribe by regulation requirements for training that a hazmat employer must give hazmat employees of the employer on the safe loading, unloading, handling, storing, and transporting of hazardous material and emergency preparedness for responding to an accident or incident involving the transportation of hazardous material.

(B) Beginning and completing training— A hazmat employer shall begin the training of hazmat employees of the employer no later than 6 months after the Secretary prescribes the regulations under subsection (a) of this section.

(C) Certification of training— After completing the training, each hazmat employer shall certify, with documentation the Secretary may require by regulation, that the hazmat employees of the employer have received training and have been tested on appropriate transportation areas of responsibility, including at least one of the following:

(1) recognizing and understanding the Department of Transportation hazardous material classification system.
(2) the use and limitations of the Department hazardous material placarding, labeling, and marking systems.
(3) general handling procedures, loading and unloading techniques, and strategies to reduce the probability of release or damage during or incidental to transporting hazardous material.
(4) health, safety, and risk factors associated with hazardous material and the transportation of hazardous material.
(5) appropriate emergency response and communication procedures for dealing with an accident or incident involving hazardous material transportation.
(6) the use of the Department Emergency Response Guidebook and recognition of its limitations or the use of equivalent documents and recognition of the limitations of those documents.
(7) applicable hazardous material transportation regulations.
(8) personal protection techniques.
(9) preparing a shipping document for transporting hazardous material.

(D) Coordination of training requirements— In consultation with the Administrator of the Environmental Protection Agency and the United States Secretary of Labor, the Secretary shall ensure that the training requirements prescribed under this section do not conflict with or duplicate—

(1) the requirements of regulations the Secretary of Labor prescribes related to hazard communication, and hazardous waste operations, and emergency response that are contained in part 1910 of title 29, Code of Federal Regulations; and
(2) the regulations the Agency prescribes related to worker protection standards for hazardous waste operations that are contained in part 311 of title 40, Code of Federal Regulations.

(E) Training grants—

(1) In general— Subject to the availability of funds, the Secretary shall make grants under this subsection—

(A) for training instructors to train hazmat employees; and
(B) to the extent determined appropriate by the Secretary, for such instructors to train hazmat employees.

(2) Eligibility— A grant under this subsection shall be made through a competitive process to a nonprofit organization that demonstrates—

(A) expertise in conducting a training program for hazmat employees; and
(B) the ability to reach and involve in a training program a target population of hazmat employees.

(F) Training of certain employees— The Secretary shall ensure that maintenance-of-way employees and railroad signalmen receive general awareness and familiarization training and safety training.

=== Material designations & labeling ===
Under the Act, transporting hazardous material requires regulations unique to the type of hazardous materials being transported.

==== Hazardous materials table ====
The table listing all hazardous materials regulated by the Act for transportation used to be at www.phmsa.dot.gov/staticfiles/PHMSA/DownloadableFiles/Files/Hazmat/Alpha_Hazmat_Table.xls.

This table identifies the hazard class of the material to inform specific packaging requirements, or outlines whether the material is forbidden in transportation.

An example of shipping papers under the HMTA.

==== Shipping papers requirements ====
Each person who offers transportation of hazardous materials must describe the material on accompanied shipping papers. The papers must include—

- an identification number
- a proper shipping name, identified in the Hazardous Materials Table
- the hazard class
- the packing group, identified in Roman numerals
- the total quantity of hazardous materials
- the number and type of packages holding the hazardous contents

Additionally, the hazardous material must be accompanied by an EPA manifest, a sheet that tracks the transportation of the hazardous material.

==== Marking requirements ====
Each "package, freight container, and transport vehicle" carrying the hazardous material must have markings that are—

- durable, in English, and printed or affixed on the surface of the shipping package, or on a label, tag, or sign on the package
- displayed on a background of sharply contrasting color
- not obscured by labels or attachments
- located away from any other marking that could reduce its effectiveness

Labels and placards for hazardous materials transportation.

==== Labeling requirements ====
Each non-bulk package, container, or small tank must be labeled with a label code corresponding to the hazard class of the hazardous material being transported, and must follow design and placement requirements.

A properly labeled package carrying hazardous materials.

==== Placarding requirements ====
Each "bulk packaging, freight container, unit load device, transport vehicle or rail car containing any quantity of a hazardous material" must be placarded corresponding to the hazard class of the hazardous material being transported, and must follow design and placement requirements.

==== Emergency response and security plans ====
Regulations providing for immediate emergency response information in an incident, as well as requirements for the development and implementation of security plans must be adhered by "any person who offers for transportation in commerce or transports in commerce" hazardous materials regulated under the Act.

=== Packaging requirements ===
Packaging requirements under the Act are detailed in Title 49 of the United States Code of Federal Regulations under §173, 178, 179, and 180. Packaging requirements vary based on the hazardous material being transported.

==== General requirements ====
Packaging material must fulfill a set of testing requirements before being authorized to store hazardous materials for transportation to endure the physical stress and environmental changes that may result in phase changes of the packaging contents during transportation.

All packaging provisions under the Act apply to—

(1) Bulk and non-bulk packagings;
(2) New packagings and packagings which are reused; and
(3) Specification and non-specification packagings.

Each package must be "designed, constructed, maintained, filled, its contents so limited, and closed" so that during transportation of hazardous contents —

(1) There will be no identifiable (without the use of instruments) release of hazardous materials to the environment;
(2) The effectiveness of the package is not reduced during transportation (can withstand changes in temperature, pressure, humidity, shocks, loadings, vibrations, etc.)
(3) The effectiveness of the package is not reduced from the mixture of gases or vapors inside the package that can compromise the packaging material; and
(4) There will be no hazardous material residue adhering to the outside of the package during transport.

===== Mixing =====
The contents of the package (the hazardous material) and the material of the package itself must be resistant to significant "chemical or galvanic reaction" that can compromise the integrity of the package. Additionally, hazardous materials may not be mixed together with other hazardous or nonhazardous materials creating a reaction causing —

- combustion or dangerous evolution of heat;
- flammable, poisonous, or asphyxiant gases; or
- formation of unstable or corrosive materials.

===== Shipper's responsibility =====
It is up to the shipper of the stored, hazardous material to determine that the compatibility between the hazardous material and the packaging is sufficient for safe transportation.

==== Description of relevant sections for which packaging requirements apply ====
49 CFR §173: General packaging requirements.
49 CFR §178: Specifications for packagings.
49 CFR §179: Specifications for tank cars.
49 CFR §180: Continuing qualification and maintenance of packagings.

=== Operational rules ===
The "operational rules" are the final key provision to the HMTA. They are a summary of the above provisions, including procedures and policies, material designations and labeling, and packaging requirements. Operational rules are covered by 49 CFR §171, 173, 174, 175, 176, and 177 and are all subjective to the U.S. Department of Transportation. Operational rules cover the entire transportation process from pick-up to delivery within all known modes of transportation subject to interstate and intrastate commerce.

==== Description of relevant sections for which operational rules apply ====
49 CFR §171- General information, regulations, and North American shipments

(a) applicability, general requirements, and North American shipments
(b) incident reporting, notification, BOE approvals and authorization
(c) authorization and requirements for the use of international transport standards and regulations

49 CFR §173: Shippers general requirements for shipping and packaging
49 CFR §174: Carriage by rail
49 CFR §175: Carriage by aircraft
49 CFR §176: Carriage by vessel
49 CFR §177: Carriage by public highway

== Major amendments ==
=== The Hazardous Materials Transportation Uniform Safety Act (1990) ===
In 1990, Congress enacted the Hazardous Materials Transportation Uniform Safety Act (HMTUSA) in order to clarify the 1975 Hazardous Materials Transportation Act. This amendment sought to standardize international hazardous material transportation requirements as recommended by the United Nations, define preemption over local state regulations that differed from the Act's regulations, and to give more authority to the Secretary of Transportation in requiring registration of hazardous materials. Before the HMTUSA was passed, the Secretary's authority to require registration by all shippers of hazardous materials and by all parties involved in the preparation of shipment (manufacture, repair, testing, or sale) was never exercised.

New provisions under this amendment were designed to "encourage uniformity among different state and local highway routing regulations, to develop criteria for the issuance of federal permits to motor carriers of hazardous materials, and to regulate the transport of radioactive materials."

The amendment also outlined two types of emergency response information:

- Information immediately available upon an accident (such as shipping papers); and
- Comprehensive and product-specific emergency response information that is also immediately available from a shipper-provided contact (whose contact information is also available on the shipping papers).

Under the HMTUSA, the Secretary continues to enforce regulations for the safe transport of hazardous material in intrastate, interstate, and foreign commerce in the same manner as the HMTA. The Secretary also retains authority to classify hazardous materials, when "they pose unreasonable risks to health, safety, or property."

=== Hazardous Materials Transportation Authorization Act (1994) ===
Signed by President Bill Clinton on August 26, 1994, the purpose of the amendment was to broaden the "regulatory and enforcement authority of the Secretary of Transportation." The Secretary is given discretionary power to require anyone who transports hazardous materials through aircraft, rail, ship, or vehicle to register with the Department of Transportation who are not already under mandatory obligation to do so. Additionally, the amendment restructured the Act, reauthorizing funding for the HMTA and requiring additional safety initiatives to be taken by the Department of Transportation. Under this amendment, its underlying goal remained the same as the Hazardous Materials Transportation Act: to protect against the risks to life, property, and the environment during the transportation of hazardous materials.

=== Influence of the September 11 Attacks (2018) ===
After the September 11 attacks, Congress considered new security measures to the Act, including background checks for truck drivers, requiring shipping companies to create alternative security plans, the use of electronic tracking devices to pinpoint exact locations of hazardous materials and their transporters, and creating strict federal penalties for hijacking trucks carrying hazardous materials. The enormity of attempting to monitor every shipment in the country was recognized as a "logistical impossibility" and an exorbitant expense. However, on October 18, 2001, Senator Hatch introduced the Hazardous Material in Transportation Protection Act of 2001, which amended the Act to require stricter regulations of issuing operational licenses for the motor-vehicular transportation of hazardous materials. Specifically, the bill prohibits states from issuing licenses to transporters unless the Secretary clears the transporter through a comprehensive background check.

== See also ==
- Comprehensive Environmental Response, Compensation, and Liability Act (CERCLA)
- Emergency Planning and Community Right-to-Know Act (EPCRA)
- Occupational Safety and Health Administration (OSHA)
- Pipeline and Hazardous Materials Safety Administration (PHMSA)
- Resource Conservation and Recovery Act (RCRA)
- United States Department of Energy (DOE)
- United States Department of Transportation (DOT)
