= HAZMAT Class 4 Flammable solids =

Flammable solids are any materials in the solid phase of matter that can readily undergo combustion in the presence of a source of ignition under standard circumstances, i.e. without:

- Artificially changing variables such as pressure or density; or
- Adding accelerants.

== Divisions ==
Division 4.1: Flammable solid

Flammable solids are any of the following four types of materials:

1. Desensitized explosives: explosives that, when dry, are explosives of Class 1 other than those of compatibility group A, which are wetted with sufficient water, alcohol, or plasticizer to suppress explosive properties; and are specifically authorized by name either in the 49CFR 172.101 Table or have been assigned a shipping name and hazard class by the associate administrator for hazardous materials safety.
2. Self-reactive materials: materials that are thermally unstable and that can undergo a strongly exothermic decomposition even without the participation of oxygen. Certain exclusions to this group do apply under 49 CFR.
3. Generic types: Division 4.1 self-reactive materials are assigned to a generic system consisting of seven types. A self-reactive substance identified by technical name in the Self-Reactive Materials Table in 49CFR 173.224 is assigned to a generic type in accordance with that table. Self-reactive materials not identified in the Self-Reactive Materials Table in 49CFR 173.224 are assigned to generic types under the procedures of paragraph (a)(2)(iii) of this section.
4. Readily combustible solids: materials that are solids which may cause a fire through friction, such as matches; show a burning rate faster than 2.2 mm (0.087 inches) per second when tested in accordance with UN Manual of Tests and Criteria; or are any metal powders that can be ignited and react over the whole length of a sample in 10 minutes or less, when tested in accordance with UN Manual of Tests and Criteria.

Type	Description
Type A	Self-reactive material type A is a self-reactive material which, as packaged for transportation, can detonate or deflagrate rapidly. Transportation of type A self-reactive material is forbidden.
Type B	Self-reactive material type B is a self-reactive material which, as packaged for transportation, neither detonates nor deflagrates rapidly, but is liable to undergo thermal explosion in a package.
Type C	Self-reactive material type C is a self-reactive material which, as packaged for transportation, neither detonates nor deflagrates rapidly and cannot undergo a thermal explosion.
Type D	Self-reactive material type D is a self-reactive material which: 1. Detonates partially, does not deflagrate rapidly and shows no violent effect when heated under confinement; 2. Does not detonate at all, deflagrates slowly and shows no violent effect when heated under confinement; or 3. Does not detonate or deflagrate at all and shows a medium effect when heated under confinement.
Type E	Self-reactive material type E is a self-reactive material which, in laboratory testing, neither detonates nor deflagrates at all and shows only a low or no effect when heated under confinement.
Type F	Self-reactive material type F is a self-reactive material which, in laboratory testing, neither detonates in the cavitated state nor deflagrates at all and shows only a low or no effect when heated under confinement as well as low or no explosive power.
Type G	Self-reactive material type G is a self-reactive material which, in laboratory testing, does not detonate in the cavitated state, will not deflagrate at all, shows no effect when heated under confinement, nor shows any explosive power. A type G self-reactive material is not subject to the requirements of this subchapter for self-reactive material of Division 4.1 provided that it is thermally stable (self-accelerating decomposition temperature is 50 °C (122 °F) or higher for a 50 kg (110 pounds) package). A self-reactive material meeting all characteristics of type G except thermal stability is classed as a type F self-reactive, temperature control material.

Division 4.2: Spontaneously combustible

Spontaneously combustible material is:

1. Pyrophoric material: A pyrophoric material is a liquid or solid that, even in small quantities and without an external ignition source, can ignite within five minutes after coming in contact with air when tested according to the UN Manual of Tests and Criteria.
2. Self-heating material: A self-heating material is a material that, when in contact with air and without an energy supply, is liable to self-heat.

Division 4.3: Dangerous when wet

Dangerous when wet material is material that, by contact with water, is liable to become spontaneously flammable or to give off flammable or toxic gas at a rate greater than 1 liter per kilogram of the material, per hour, when tested in accordance with the UN Manual of Tests and Criteria. Pure alkali metals are known examples of this.

== Placards ==
Hazardous Materials; Class 4.1: Flammable Solids	Hazardous Materials; Class 4.2: Spontaneously Combustible Solids	Hazardous Materials; Class 4.3: Dangerous when Wet

== Compatibility table ==
Load and Segregation Chart
	Mass	1.1	1.2	1.3	1.4	1.5	1.6	2.1	2.2	2.2	2.3		3	4.1	4.2	4.3	5.1	5.2	6.1	7	8
	Mass	1.1	1.2	1.3	1.4	1.5	1.6	2.1	2.2	2.2	A	B	3	4.1	4.2	4.3	5.1	5.2	A	7	8
4.1	1,001 lb (454 kg)	No	No			No					No	O							No		O
4.2	1,001 lb (454 kg)	No	No	No	O	No					No	O							No		No
4.3	Any quantity	No	No	No		No					No	O							No		O
Key
The absence of any hazard class or division or a blank space in the table indicates that no restrictions apply.: X: These materials may not be loaded, transported, or stored together in the same transport vehicle or storage facility during the course of transportation.; O: Indicates that these materials may not be loaded, transported or stored together in the same transport vehicle or storage facility during the course of transportation, unless separated in a manner that, in the event of leakage from packages under conditions normally incident to transportation, commingling of hazardous materials would not occur.; Source: United States Code of Federal Regulations, Title 49 CFR §177.848 - Segregation of hazardous materials.
