= Hazardous Materials Identification System =

Numerical hazard rating using colour coded labels

An example of a HMIS III label for Diesel fuel.

The Hazardous Materials Identification System (HMIS) is a proprietary numerical hazard rating that incorporates the use of labels with color bars developed by the American Coatings Association as a compliance aid for the OSHA Hazard Communication (HazCom) Standard. The name and abbreviation is a trademark of the American Coatings Association.

== History ==
HMIS was introduced in 1981 as a resource for the paint and coatings industry, by the National Paint and Coatings Association, derived from systems developed by PPG Industries and DuPont. Despite being a resource for the paint and coding industry, it soon expanded to general industries also looking to comply with OSHA regulations.

The second edition was released in 1986, HMIS II, which introduced letter codes for identifying personal protective equipment to be used, and the 'asterisk' to the Health bar, to identify when a substance poses a long term health hazard, such as carcinogens. This would be placed in the same box as the health number.

The third edition, HMIS III, released in 2002 represented a significant change to the system, replacing the yellow 'reactivity' bar, with an orange 'Physical Hazard' bar. HMIS III also adopted the OSHA flammability, as defined by Standard 1910.106. The Personal protective field also was changed to eliminate the box, and allow for including multiple small letters allowing for easier combinations of PPE that were not provided in the original code set. An extra box was provided in the health field, to allow the asterisk introduced in HMIS II for long term 'chronic' health hazards to stand out better.

In 2012, OSHA introduced an updated version of their HazCom standard known as HazCom 2012, which mandates GHS Labels on shipped containers, and updated requirements for workplace labels, which are compatible with GHS, although it does not mandate the use of GHS in the workplace. Concerns have been raised due to a contradiction that has occurred, as GHS and HMIS use conflicting scales, with HMIS going 1 (low) to 4 (High), versus OSHA and GHS scales that are 1 (High) to 4 (low).

== Symbols ==
The four bars are color-coded, using the modern color bar symbols with blue indicating the level of health hazard, red for flammability, orange for a physical hazard, and white for Personal Protection. The number ratings range from 0 to 4.

=== Blue (Health) ===
The Health section conveys the health hazards of the material. In the latest version of HMIS, the Health bar has two spaces, one for an asterisk and one for a numeric hazard rating. If present, the asterisk signifies a chronic health hazard, meaning that long-term exposure to the material could cause a health problem such as emphysema or kidney damage. According to ACA, the numeric hazard assessment procedure differs from that used by NFPA.

- 4. Life-threatening, major or permanent damage may result from single or repeated overexposures (e.g., hydrogen cyanide).
- 3. Major injury likely unless prompt action is taken and medical treatment is given.
- 2. Temporary or minor injury may occur (e.g., diethyl ether).
- 1. Irritation or minor reversible injury possible.
- 0. No significant risk to health.

=== Red (Flammability) ===
For HMIS I and II, the criteria used to assign numeric values (0 = low hazard to 4 = high hazard) are identical to those used by NFPA. In other words, in this category, HMIS I & II are identical to NFPA. For HMIS III, the flammability criteria are defined according to OSHA standards (which add elevated flammability ratings for aerosols). (HMIS II descriptions, excluding the new aerosol criteria, are shown below)

- 4. Flammable gases, or very volatile flammable liquids with flash points below 73 °F (23 °C), and boiling points below 100 °F (38 °C). Materials may ignite spontaneously with air (e.g., propane).
- 3. Materials capable of ignition under almost all normal temperature conditions. Includes flammable liquids with flash points below 73 °F (23 °C) and boiling points above 100 °F (38 °C), as well as liquids with flash points between 73 °F and 100 °F.
- 2. Materials which must be moderately heated or exposed to high ambient temperatures before ignition will occur. Includes liquids having a flash point at or above 100 °F (38 °C) but below 200 °F (93 °C) (e.g., diesel fuel).
- 1. Materials that must be preheated before ignition will occur. Includes liquids, solids and semi solids having a flash point above 200 °F (93 °C) (e.g., canola oil).
- 0. Materials that will not burn (e.g., Water).

=== Yellow/Orange (Reactivity/Physical Hazard) ===
Reactivity hazards are assessed using the OSHA criterion of physical hazard. Seven such hazard classes are recognized: Water Reactives, Organic Peroxides, Explosives, Compressed gases, Pyrophoric materials, Oxidizers, and Unstable Reactives. The numerical ratings are very similar to NFPA's yellow "Reactivity/Instability" rating according to the publicly available data, which is limited to "hazard statements" intended to accompany each rating (as shown below). However, HMIS is a proprietary system, and without referring to the actual criteria for each rating, it is not clear how similar they are.

- 4. Materials that are readily capable of explosive water reaction, detonation or explosive decomposition, polymerization, or self-reaction at normal temperature and pressure (e.g., chlorine dioxide, nitroglycerin).
- 3. Materials that may form explosive mixtures with water and are capable of detonation or explosive reaction in the presence of a strong initiating source. Materials may polymerize, decompose, self-react, or undergo other chemical change at normal temperature and pressure with moderate risk of explosion (e.g., ammonium nitrate).
- 2. Materials that are unstable and may undergo violent chemical changes at normal temperature and pressure with low risk for explosion. Materials may react violently with water or form peroxides upon exposure to air (e.g., potassium, sodium).
- 1. Materials that are normally stable but can become unstable (self-react) at high temperatures and pressures. Materials may react non-violently with water or undergo hazardous polymerization in the absence of inhibitors (e.g., propene).
- 0. Materials that are normally stable, even under fire conditions, and will not react with water, polymerize, decompose, condense, or self-react. Non-explosives (e.g., helium).

=== White (Personal Protection) ===
This is by far the largest area of difference between the NFPA and HMIS systems. In the NFPA system, the white area is used to convey special hazards whereas HMIS uses the white section to indicate which personal protective equipment (PPE) should be used when working with the material.

- X. ask supervisor or safety specialist for handling instructions, or refer to the Safety Data Sheet (SDS) for specific directions
- K. airline hood or mask, gloves, full suit and boots
- J. splash goggles, gloves, apron and a dust/vapor respirator
- I. safety glasses, gloves and a dust/vapor respirator
- H. splash goggles, gloves, apron and a vapor respirator
- G. safety glasses, a vapor respirator
- F. safety glasses, gloves, apron and a dust respirator
- E. safety glasses, gloves and a dust respirator
- D. face shield, gloves and an apron
- C. safety glasses, gloves and an apron
- B. safety glasses and gloves
- A. safety glasses

== Comparisons with NFPA 704 ==
The HMIS system is frequently compared with the National Fire Protection Association's NFPA 704 "fire diamond". The systems, while having some general similarities, are not interchangeable, nor serve the same purpose.

NFPA 704 was devised in the 1960s, in response to an issue that firefighters were encountering: responding to a fire and not knowing specifics about the materials involved and being seriously injured or killed by violent reactions to firefighting efforts. In 1959, 13 firefighters in Charlotte, NC, were seriously injured by an explosion caused by water being poured onto a burning vat containing metallic sodium. The fire department devised a system to inform firefighters of hazards, such as water reactivity or flammability, which became NFPA 704. The intended use is identifying general hazards for first responders in an emergency situations.

HMIS was developed as a solution to OSHA's Hazard Communication Standard, which required employers to inform employees of hazardous substances in workplaces. At the time, HCS did not specify a system, nor provide one. Just that employees needed to have a labeling system. The health rating varies from NFPA 704, as a worker using a chemical daily has a different exposure over time compared to a firefighter at a single instance. HMIS is intended for normal usage and conditions, and not emergency situations.

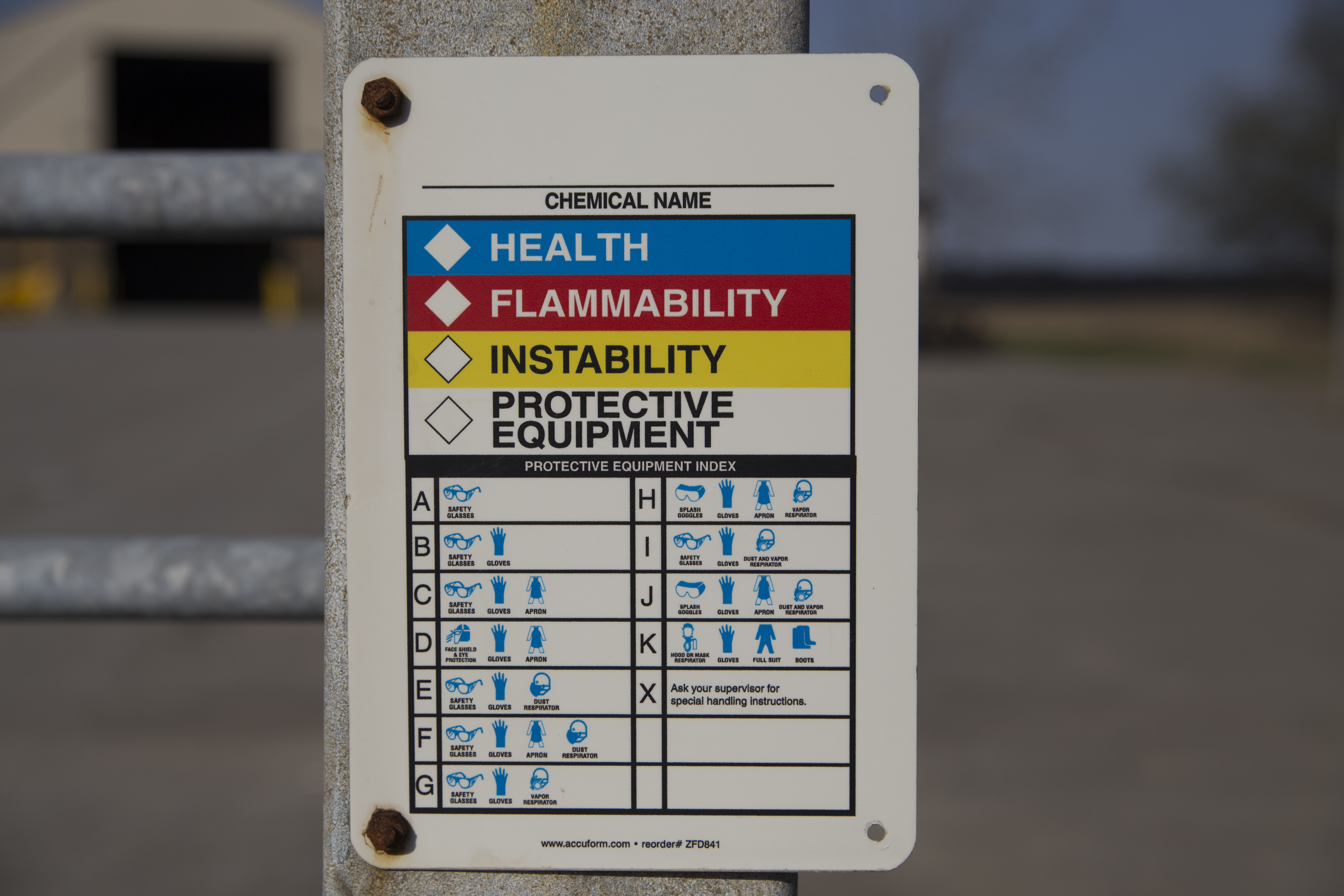
A sign that uses a yellow 'Instability' bar, which was never part of HMIS. ("Instability" is a NFPA 704 term.)

Prior to 2002, with HMIS' third edition (HMIS III), both systems used the same colors, blue, red, yellow and white, and used the same criteria for 'flammability'/'Fire Hazard' and 'reactivity'. HMIS retired the yellow reactivity bar due to changes in how NFPA's equivalent, renamed 'Instability', that resulted in it no longer being suitable for HMIS. HMIS III also adopted the OSHA flammability criteria, as defined by Standard 1910.106. The orange 'Physical hazard' bar is defined through OSHA's physical hazard

Combining the systems, such as using an NFPA 704 fire diamond, but placing HMIS PPE information in the white 'special hazards' square, is discouraged by both the ACA and NFPA. In spite of this position from both organizations, the combining of systems still occurs on labels and posters, sometimes as a result of trying to mimic the proprietary system, while not directly infringing on it.

== See also ==
- Emergency Response Guidebook – Reference book for emergency response personnel
- Fire Diamond (NFPA 704) – Hazmat labeling system
- Hazmat – Substances harmful to people, property or the environment
