= Class 9 =

Class 9, Class 09 and Class IX may refer to:

- BR Standard Class 9F, a steam locomotive class of the United Kingdom
- BR Standard Class 9F 92020-9
- British Rail Class 09, a diesel locomotive class of the United Kingdom
- Eurotunnel Class 9, an electric class locomotive
- G&SWR 9 Class
- GCR Class 9A
- GCR Class 9D
- GCR Class 9F, a steam locomotive class of the United Kingdom
- GCR Class 9J
- GCR Class 9K
- GCR Class 9N, a steam locomotive class of the United Kingdom
- GCR Class 9Q
- GCR Class 9P
- GNR Class J9
- HAZMAT Class 9 Miscellaneous, a category of hazardous material
- I-9-class submarine
- Indian locomotive class WAG-9
- LSWR F9 class
- LSWR T9 class
- MGWR Class 9
- NSB Class 9, a standard-gauge steam locomotive class of Norway
- NSB Class IX, a narrow-gauge steam locomotive class of Norway
- NSB El 9, an electric locomotive class of Norway
- O 9-class submarine
- PGM-9-class motor gunboat
- Prussian T 9
- Southern Pacific class AC-9
- Class IX (U.S. Army), Repair parts and components, including kits, assemblies and subassemblies, repairable and unrepairable, required for maintenance support of all equipment

class 9 is new chapter of life
