= UN number =

United Nations code for dangerous substances

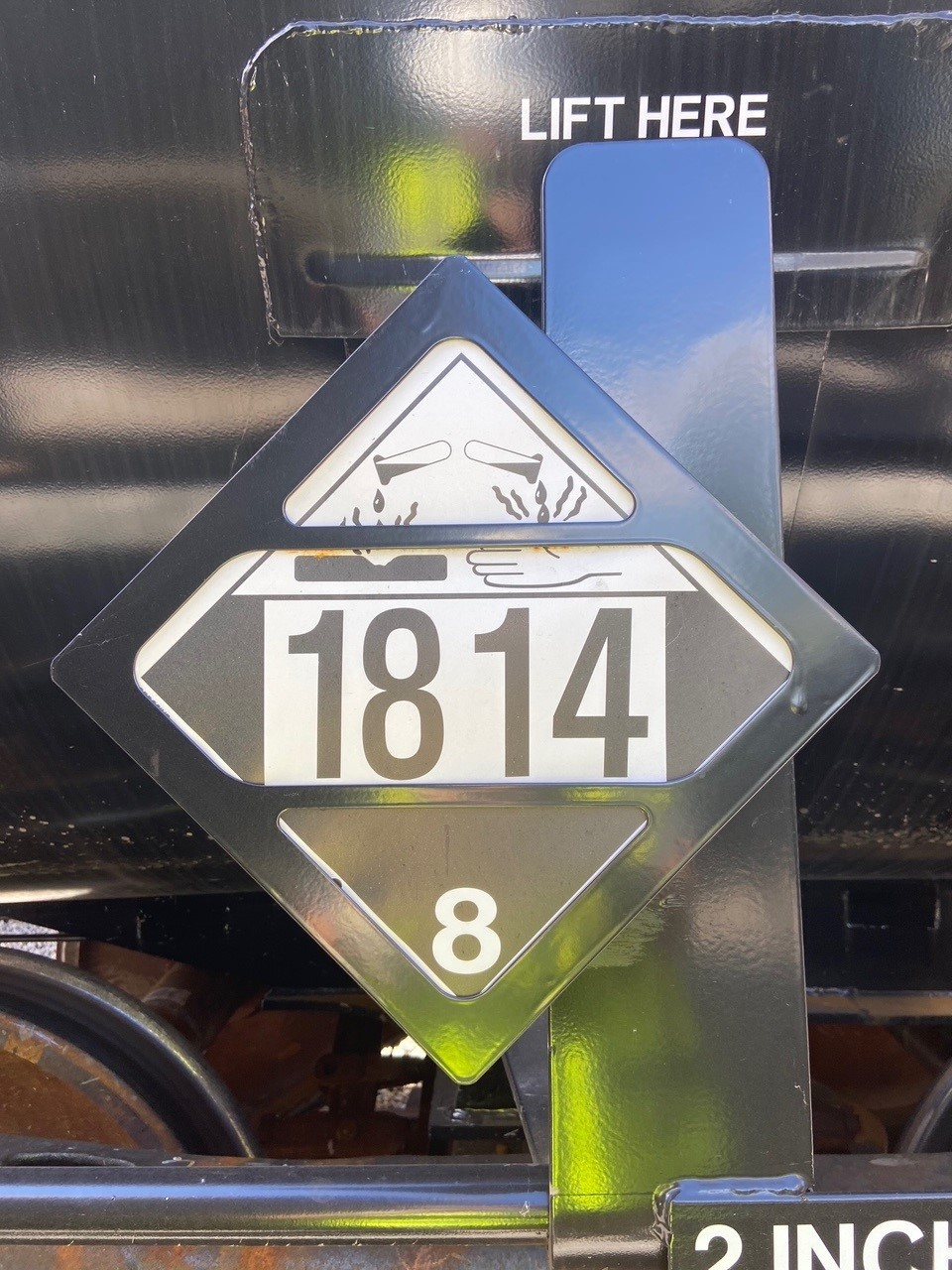
A United States placard showing the UN number 1814, indicating potassium hydroxide solution, on a railroad tank car

A UN number (United Nations number) is a four-digit number that identifies hazardous materials, and articles (such as explosives, flammable liquids, oxidizers, toxic liquids, etc.) in the framework of international trade and transport. Some hazardous substances have their own UN numbers (e.g. acrylamide has UN 2074), while sometimes groups of chemicals or products with similar properties receive a common UN number (e.g. flammable liquids, not otherwise specified, have UN 1993). A chemical in its solid state may receive a different UN number than the liquid phase if its hazardous properties differ significantly; substances with different levels of purity (or concentration in solution) may also receive different UN number.

== Hazard identifiers ==
Associated with each UN number is a hazard identifier, which encodes the general hazard class and subdivision (and, in the case of explosives, their compatibility group). If a substance poses several dangers, then subsidiary risk identifiers may be specified. It is not possible to deduce the hazard class(es) of a substance from its UN number: they have to be looked up in a table.

== Range ==
UN numbers range from UN 0004 to about UN 3550 (UN 0001 – UN 0003 are no longer in use) and are assigned by the United Nations Committee of Experts on the Transport of Dangerous Goods. They are published as part of their Recommendations on the Transport of Dangerous Goods, also known as the Orange Book. These recommendations are adopted by the regulatory organization responsible for the different modes of transport. There is no UN number allocated to non-dangerous substances.

== Non-UN identifiers ==
An NA number (North America number) is issued by the United States Department of Transportation and is identical to UN numbers, except that some substances without a UN number may have an NA number. These additional NA numbers use the range NA 9000 - NA 9279. There are some exceptions, for example, NA 2212 is all asbestos with UN 2212 limited to asbestos, amphibole amosite, tremolite, actinolite, anthophyllite, or crocidolite. Another exception, NA 3334, is self-defense spray, non-pressurized while UN 3334 is aviation-regulated liquid, not otherwise specified. For the complete list, see NA/UN exceptions.

An ID number is a third type of identification number used for hazardous substances being offered for air transport. Substances with an ID number are associated with proper shipping names recognized by the ICAO Technical Instructions. ID 8000, Consumer commodity does not have a UN or NA number, and is classed as a Class 9 hazardous material.

== See also ==
- Globally Harmonized System of Classification and Labelling of Chemicals – International standard managed by the United Nations
- Lists of UN numbers
- Dangerous goods – Substances harmful to people, property or the environment
- CAS Registry Number – Chemical identifier
- List of NA numbers
