= Boyne Obelisk =

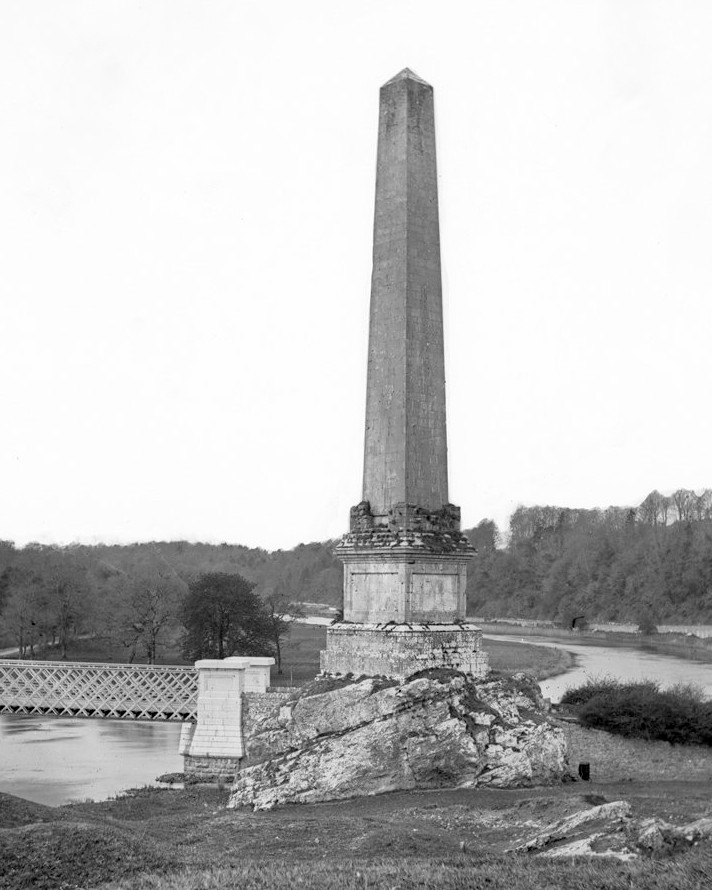
- The obelisk in 1890
- Interactive map of Boyne Obelisk
- Location: Oldbridge, County Louth, Ireland
- Coordinates: 53°43′31.4″N 6°25′.2″W
- Type: Obelisk
- Material: Granite
- Height: 53 m (174 ft)
- Completion date: c.1736
- Dedicated to: King William III
- Dismantled date: 31 May 1923

The Boyne Obelisk, also known as King William's Obelisk, was an obelisk located in Oldbridge, near Drogheda, County Louth, Ireland.

== History ==
The monument was erected in order to commemorate William of Orange's victory over King James II at the Battle of the Boyne in 1690, and was located near the spot where William's forces crossed the River Boyne to engage James' forces. The foundation stone was laid on 17 April 1736 by Lionel Sackville, Lord Lieutenant of Ireland.

Notably, King George IV visited the monument on 25 August 1821, as part of his visit to Ireland. A large crowd had gathered to see the king at the site, where he spent about 20 minutes. While there, the king received an audience with the Presbyterian Synod of Ulster.

In May 1894, two young men gathering watercresses from the river near the obelisk discovered an old sword under the mud in the water. The hilt was made of bone, the guard of ornamental silver gilt-work, and the blade was notched in several places and severely rusted. It was thought to have been used by a Williamite soldier in the Battle of the Boyne.

Around July 1895, the obelisk was struck by lightning and badly damaged. An appeal was made for donations to fund its restoration (amounting to £100), which was later completed under the superintendence of James Franklin Fuller.

During the Home Rule crisis, members of the Ulster Flying Column and Dispatch Riding Corps travelled to Oldbridge on 28 July 1913, and planted a Union Jack and placard on the base of the obelisk, which were later removed. The placard read:

Rebel hands may tear down this flag but they will never tame the Lion Hearts of Ulster!

The obelisk stood until 31 May 1923, when it was destroyed shortly after the end of the Irish Civil War, purportedly by members of the National Army using three explosives or landmines removed from a nearby Irish Army camp. Only a small stump remains of the former monument.

== Features ==
The obelisk was made from granite and was built upon a large mound of rock (9 metres/30 ft high) located on the north bank of the River Boyne. At a height of 53 metres (174 ft), it was both the tallest man-made structure in Ireland and the tallest obelisk in Europe at the time of its construction. It initially stood adjacent to a wooden bridge spanning the river, which was later replaced by a lattice iron bridge (built by the Drogheda-based Thomas Grendon and Company) that was completed in 1869 and named the Obelisk Bridge, after the monument.

The square base of the obelisk bore an inscription on each of its sides. The north side inscription read:

Sacred to the glorious memory of King William the Third, who, on the 1st of July, 1690, passed the river near this place to attack James the Second, at the head of the Popish army, advantageously posted on the south side of it, and did, on that day, by a single battle, secure to us and to our posterity, our liberty, laws, and religion. In consequence of this action James the Second left this Kingdom and fled to France. This memorial of our deliverance was erected in the 9th year of King George the Second; The first stone being laid by Lionel Sackville, Duke of Dorset, Lord Lieutenant of the Kingdom of Ireland, MDCCXXXVI

The south side inscription read:

Marshal the Duke of Schomberg in passing this river died bravely fighting in defence of liberty

The east side inscription read:

July 1st MDCLXXXX

The west side inscription read:

This monument was erected by the grateful contributions of several protestants of Great Britain and Ireland

== Gallery ==
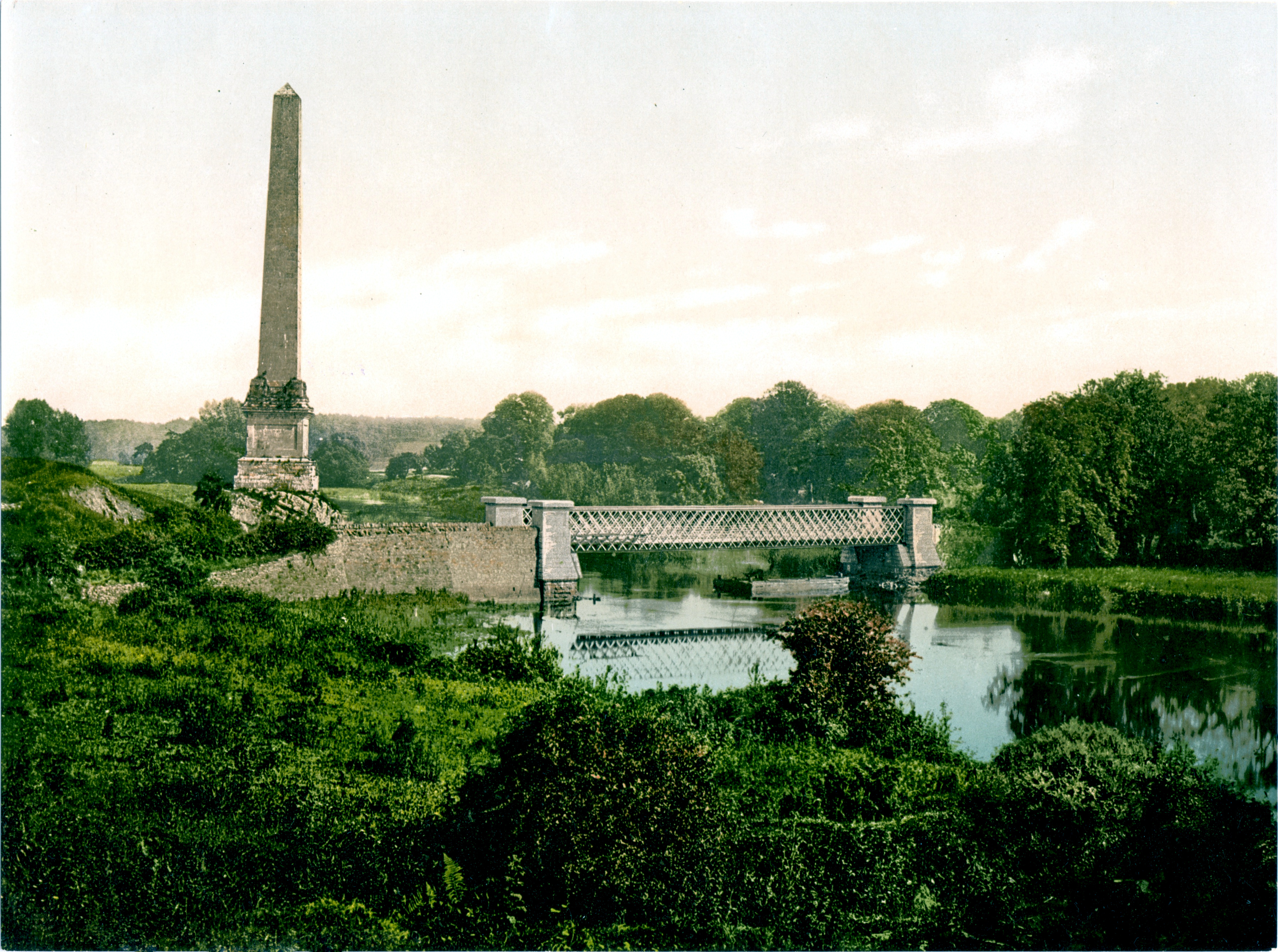
Panoramic view of the Obelisk and the adjoining bridge from the west side (c.1890–1900)

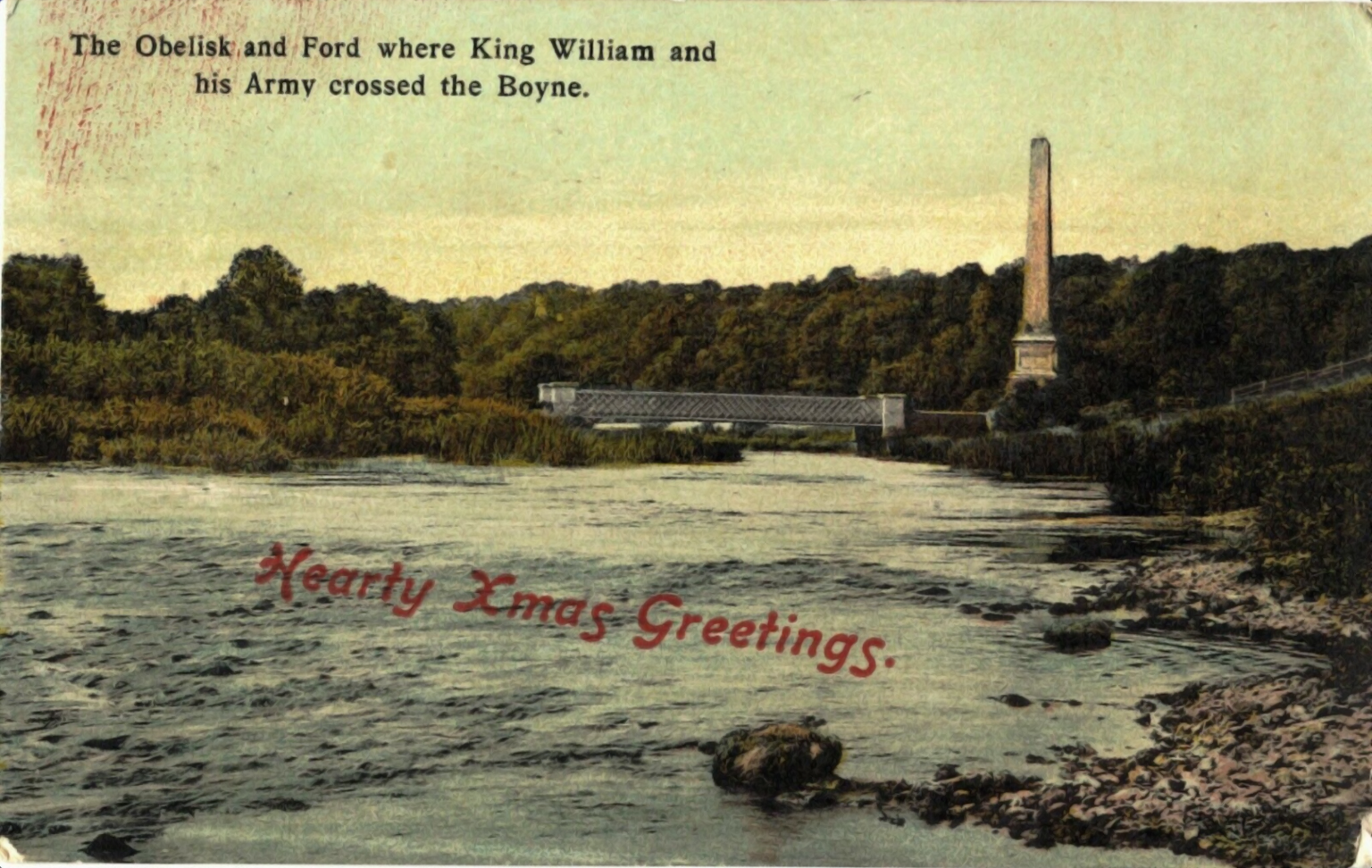
A Christmas postcard (c.1918–1923) displaying a panoramic painting of the Obelisk and adjoining bridge from the east side

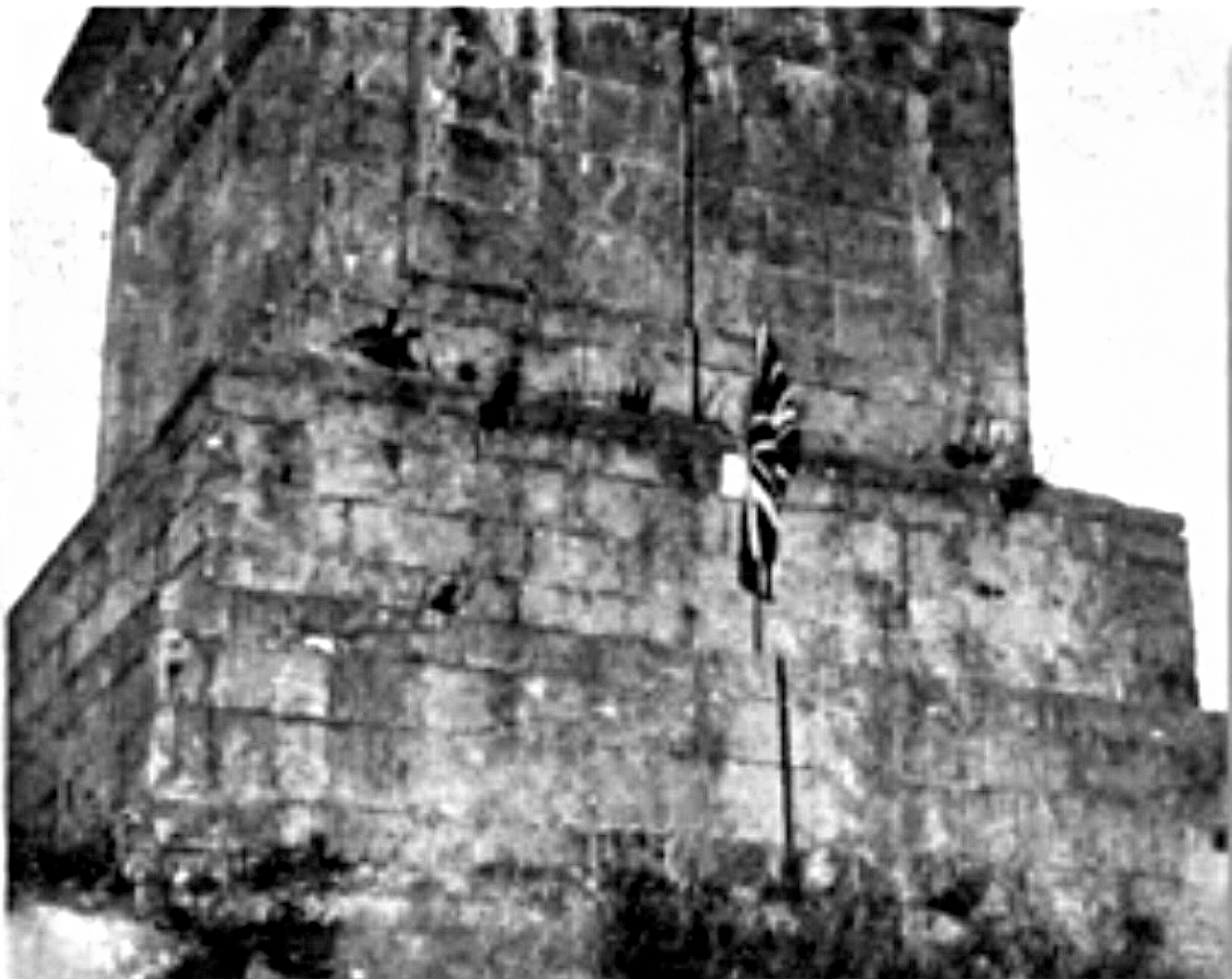
The base of the Obelisk in July 1913, with a Union Jack planted on it by loyalist militants

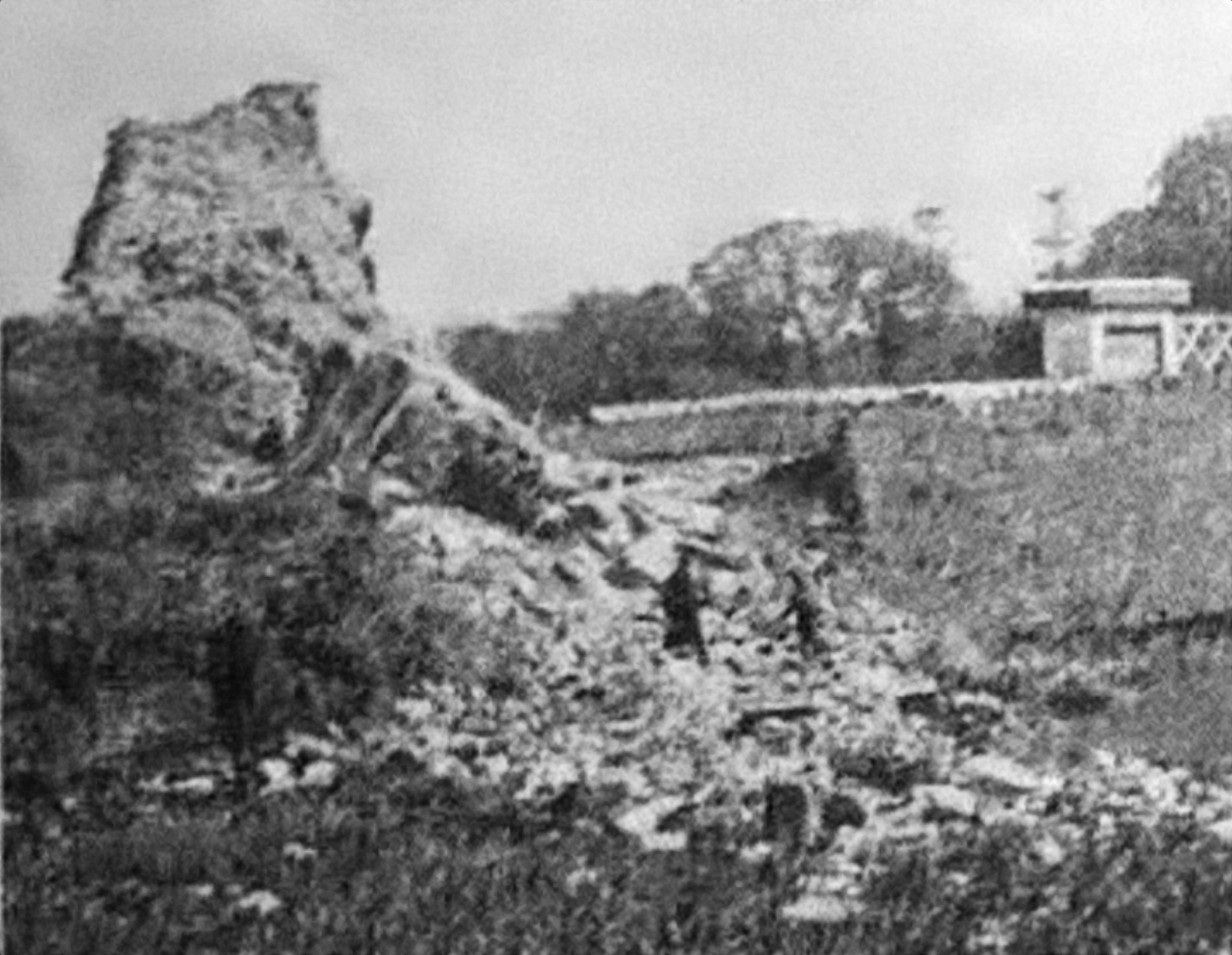
The Obelisk after its destruction (west side)

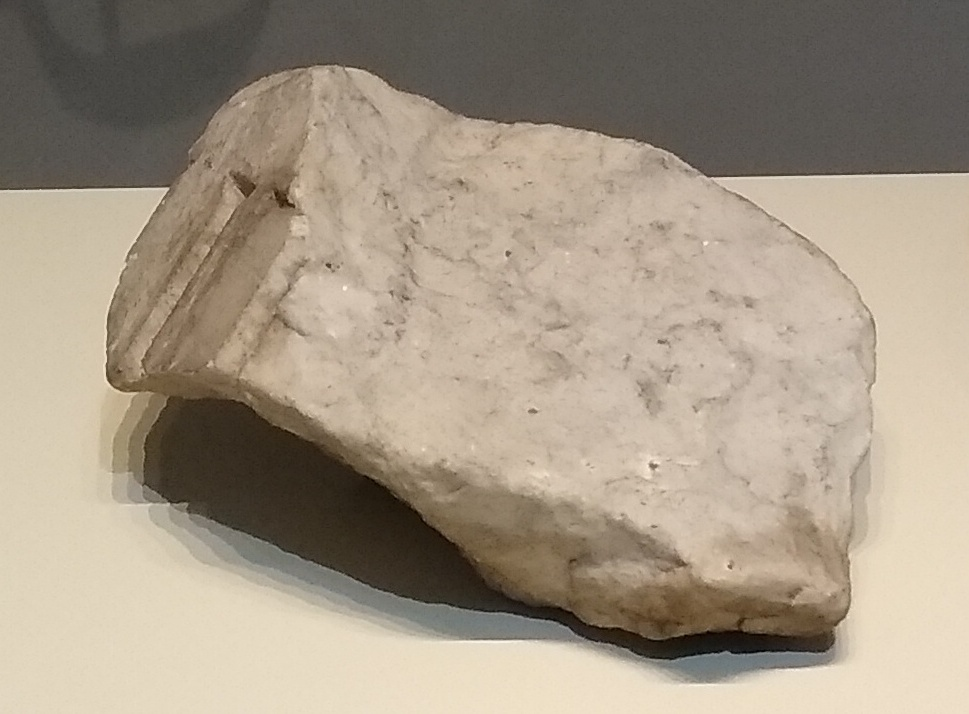
A piece of the Obelisk on display at the Museum of Orange Heritage in Belfast in 2021
