= MGWR Class 9 =

Class of 4 Irish 0-6-0 locomotives

Type and origin
- Power type: Steam
- Builder: Grendon
- Build date: 1855-1856
Specifications
- Configuration
  - Whyte: 0-6-0
- Gauge: 5 ft 3 in (1,600 mm)
- Driver dia.: 45 ft 1 in (13,740 mm)
- Loco weight: 20 tons
Career
- Operators: Midland Great Western Railway (MGWR)
- Number in class: 4 (MGWR)
- Numbers: 36-39
- Locale: Ireland
- Delivered: 1855-1856
- Withdrawn: 1881

The Midland Great Western Railway (MGWR) Class 9 consisted of four engines built by Thomas Grendon and Company of Drogheda in the period 1855-1856.

MGWR No.	Name	Introduced	Withdrawn
36	Stockwell	1855	1881
37	Voltigeur	1855	1881
38	Birdcatcher	1856	1881
39	Harkaway	1856	1881

The MGWR Class 9 was the first 0-6-0 type on the MGWR. It has 5 feet 1 inch (1.55 m) driving wheels. They were ordered by Edward Wilson during his short tenure as Locomotive Superintendent from 1853. It is speculated Wilson had little to do with the design, especially as Robert Stephenson and Company had subcontracted an 0-6-0 build to Grendons at this time.

The 0-6-0 three driving axle design has 6 driving wheels against the rail as opposed to the 2-4-0 or 4-2-0 which have two axles and 4 driving wheels. If other factors are equal will have better adhesion and less propensity to slip and should be able to haul a heavier train, for example the MGWR Class 9 had demonstrated the capability to pull 600 tons at 20 miles per hour (32 km/h). The difficulty lies in a coupling rod over more than 2 axles is more complex to allow for vertical motion. The next two Locomotive Superintendents, Joseph Cabry and Robert Ramage, remained with the 2-4-0, 4-2-0 and even 2-2-2 one or two driving axles designs. It was not until Martin Atock became Locomotive Superintendent in 1872 that further 0-6-0 locomotives were ordered with MGWR Class L four years later.

Grendons supplied two similar engines to the Dundalk and Enniskillen Railway at about the same time.
