= List of NA numbers =

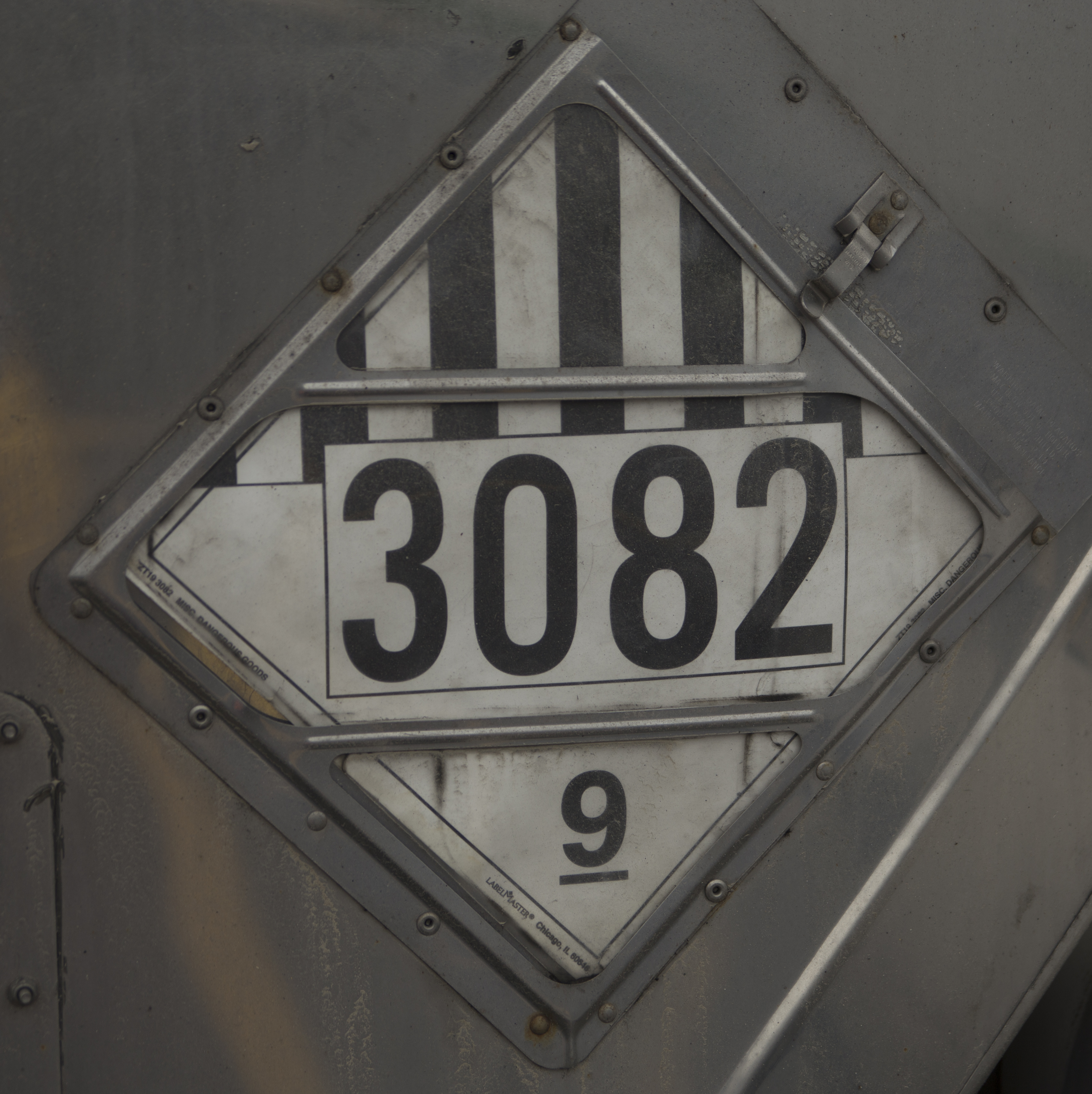
Photograph of a placard with NA number 3082

The NA numbers (North American Numbers) are assigned by the United States Department of Transportation, supplementing the larger set of UN numbers, for identifying hazardous materials. NA numbers largely duplicate UN numbers, however a selection of additional numbers are provided for materials that are not covered by UN numbers as a hazardous material. In a couple of instances NA numbers provide an alternative description than the equivalent UN number.

NA number	Class	Material	Varies from UN Number?	Notes
NA 0027	4.1	Black powder for small arms	No	
NA 0124	1.1D	Jet perforating guns, charged oil well, with detonator	No	
NA 0276	1.4C	Model rocket motor	No	
NA 0323	1.4S	Model rocket motor	No	
NA 0331	1.5D	Ammonium nitrate-fuel oil (ANFO) mixture containing only prilled ammonium nitrate and fuel oil	No	
NA 0337	1.4S	Toy Caps	No	
NA 0494	1.4D	Jet perforating guns, charged oil well, with detonator	No	
NA 1057	3	Lighters, non-pressurized, containing flammable liquid,	Yes	
NA 1270	3	Petroleum oil	No	
NA 1325	4.1	Fusee (railway or highway)	Yes	
NA 1350	9	Sulfur	No	
NA 1361	4.2	Charcoal briquettes, shell, screenings, wood, etc.	No	
NA 1365	9	Cotton	Yes	
NA 1556	6.1	Methyldichloroarsine	Yes	
NA 1613	6.1	Hydrocyanic acid, aqueous solutions with less than 5 percent hydrogen cyanide	No	
NA 1693	6.1	Tear gas devices with more than 2 percent tear gas substances, by mass	Yes	
NA 1759	8	Ferrous chloride, solid	Yes	
NA 1760	8	Chemical kit	Yes	
NA 1760	8	Compounds, cleaning liquid	Yes	
NA 1760	8	Compounds, tree killing, liquid or Compounds, weed killing, liquid	Yes	
NA 1760	8	Ferrous chloride, solution	Yes	
NA 1911	2.1	Diborane mixtures	Yes	
NA 1954	2.1	Refrigerant gases, n.o.s. (Note: Not Otherwise Specified) or Dispersant gases, n.o.s.	Yes	
NA 1955	2.3	Organic phosphate, mixed with compressed gas or Organic phosphate compound, mixed with compressed gas or Organic phosphorus compound, mixed with compressed gas	Yes	
NA 1961	2.1	Ethane-Propane mixture, refrigerated liquid	No	
NA 1967	2.3	Parathion and compressed gas mixture	Yes	
NA 1987	3	Denatured alcohol	Yes	
NA 1993	Combustible liquid	Combustible liquid, n.o.s.	yes	
NA 1993	3	Compounds, cleaning liquid	yes	
NA 1993	3	Compounds, tree killing, liquid or Compounds, weed killing, liquid	yes	
NA 1993	3	Diesel fuel	yes	
NA 1993	3	Fuel oil (No. 1, 2, 4, 5, or 6)	yes	
NA 1999	3	Asphalt, at or above its flash point	No	
NA 2212	9	Asbestos	Yes	
NA 2448	9	Sulfur, molten	No	
NA 2810	6.1	Compounds, tree killing, liquid or Compounds, weed killing, liquid	Yes	
NA 2845	6.1	Ethyl phosphonous dichloride, anhydrous pyrophoric liquid	Yes	
NA 2845	6.1	Methyl phosphonous dichloride, pyrophoric liquid	Yes	
NA 2927	2.1	Ethyl phosphonothioic dichloride, anhydrous	Yes	
NA 2927	2.1	Ethyl phosphorodichloridate	Yes	
NA 3077	9	Hazardous waste, solid, n.o.s.	Yes	
NA 3077	9	Other regulated substances, solid, n.o.s	Yes	
NA 3082	9	Hazardous waste, liquid, n.o.s.	No	
NA 3082	9	Other regulated substances, liquid, n.o.s.	No	
NA 3178	4.1	Smokeless powder for small arms (100 pounds or less)	No	
NA 3334	9	Self-defense spray, non-pressurized	Yes	
NA 3356	9	Oxygen generator, chemical, spent	Yes	
NA 9035	2.3	Gas identification set	No	
NA 9191	5.1	Chlorine dioxide, hydrate, frozen	No	
NA 9202	2.3	Carbon monoxide, refrigerated liquid (cryogenic liquid)	No	
NA 9206	6.1	Methyl phosphonic dichloride	No	
NA 9259	(9)	Elevated temperature material, liquid, n.o.s.	No	No longer in use
NA 9260	9	Aluminum, molten	No	
NA 9263	6.1	Chloropivaloyl chloride	No	
NA 9264	6.1	3,5-Dichloro-2,4,6-trifluoropyridine	No	
NA 9269	6.1	Trimethoxysilane	No	
NA 9279	2.1	Hydrogen absorbed in metal hydride	No	

== See also ==
- List of UN numbers
- NA/UN exceptions - List of specific conflicts between NA numbers and UN numbers.
