= Inspection locomotive =

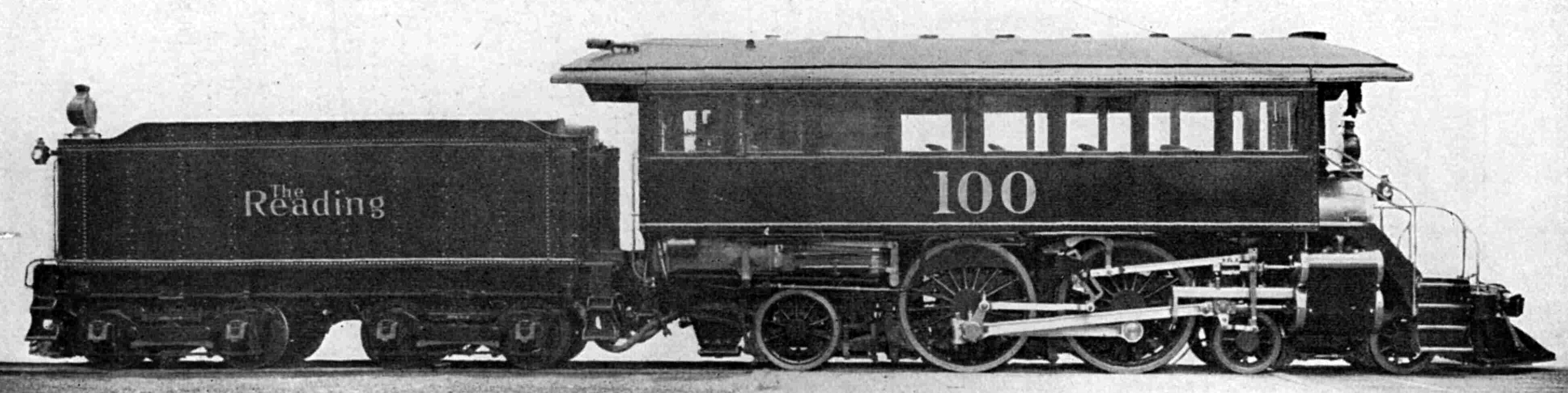
Inspection locomotive of the Philadelphia and Reading Railroad, a 4-4-2 "Atlantic" type.

An inspection locomotive was a special type of locomotive designed to carry railroad officials on inspection tours of the railroad property.

== Background ==
Steam inspection locomotives were fitted with passenger car-like bodywork and seating. Many railroads in the nineteenth century owned one, but their use dwindled in the twentieth century. They were replaced with converted passenger-car inspection cars, or HiRail trucks, automobiles fitted with steel flanged wheels.

Some were especially built for this service, while others were rebuilt from obsolete locomotives. Many were quite small; the locomotive pictured is in fact one of the largest and most modern inspection locomotives ever constructed. They were generally well cared for and highly decorated.

== History by country ==
=== Brazil ===
In 1928, the Leopoldina Railway (de) purchased an inspection steam railcar by Sentinel Waggon Works.

=== China ===
In 1907, the South Manchuria Railway in Manchuria (today northeastern China) bought two inspection locomotives built by Baldwin Locomotive Works. An engine of the same class was delivered to Rochester & Pittsburg Coal & Iron Company in 1903.

=== Peru ===
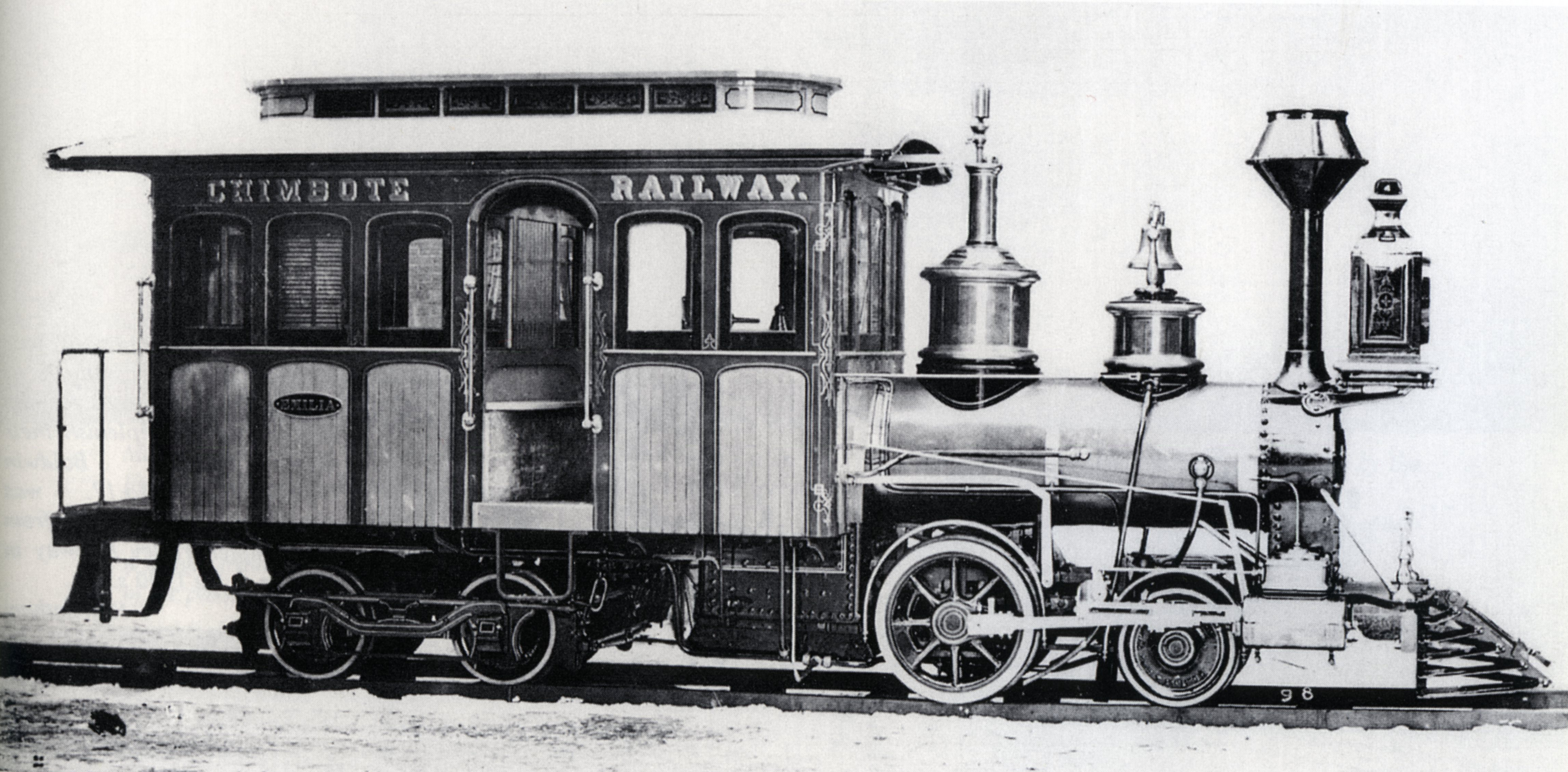
Inspection locomotive of the peruvian Chimbote Railway in 1880.

The 3 ft narrow gauge Chimbote Railway (de) had an inspection locomotive built 1880 by Baldwin Locomotive Works. The special feature was that it was equipped with a sleeping compartment.

=== Russia ===
From the late 1980s to the first half of the 2000s, a number of Škoda passenger electric locomotives were converted into inspection locomotives on the West Siberian Railway at the Omsk depot and some other depots in Russia. The electrical equipment of these locomotives was retained only in the middle part of the engine room, while the electrical equipment at the edges behind the driver's cab was eliminated and replaced with passenger seats, and the starting and braking resistors were moved to the roof. At least one four-axle ChS1 (№ 073), eight four-axle ChS3 electric locomotives (№ 32, 41, 42, 50, 56, 64, 67, 70), and four six-axle ChS2 electric locomotives (№ 031, 053, 100, 101) are known to have been modernized. Most of the locomotives retained their original bodies, with only the side windows replaced with wider ones. However, the last locomotive, ChS2-101, converted in 2006, received a new body and driver's cab. As of 2025, this electric locomotive is the only one remaining in service in Novosibirsk; the others were scrapped, and only ChS1-073 is preserved in the Novosibirsk Railway Museum. The Zaporizhzhia Electric Locomotive Repair Plant (Ukraine) also converted two ChS2-549 and 552 electric locomotives, ChS2-552, into inspection locomotives, AChS2, for the Moscow Railway. As of 2025, they have been retired from service and preserved in the museum at the Tula railway station and Perovo railway station in Moscow.

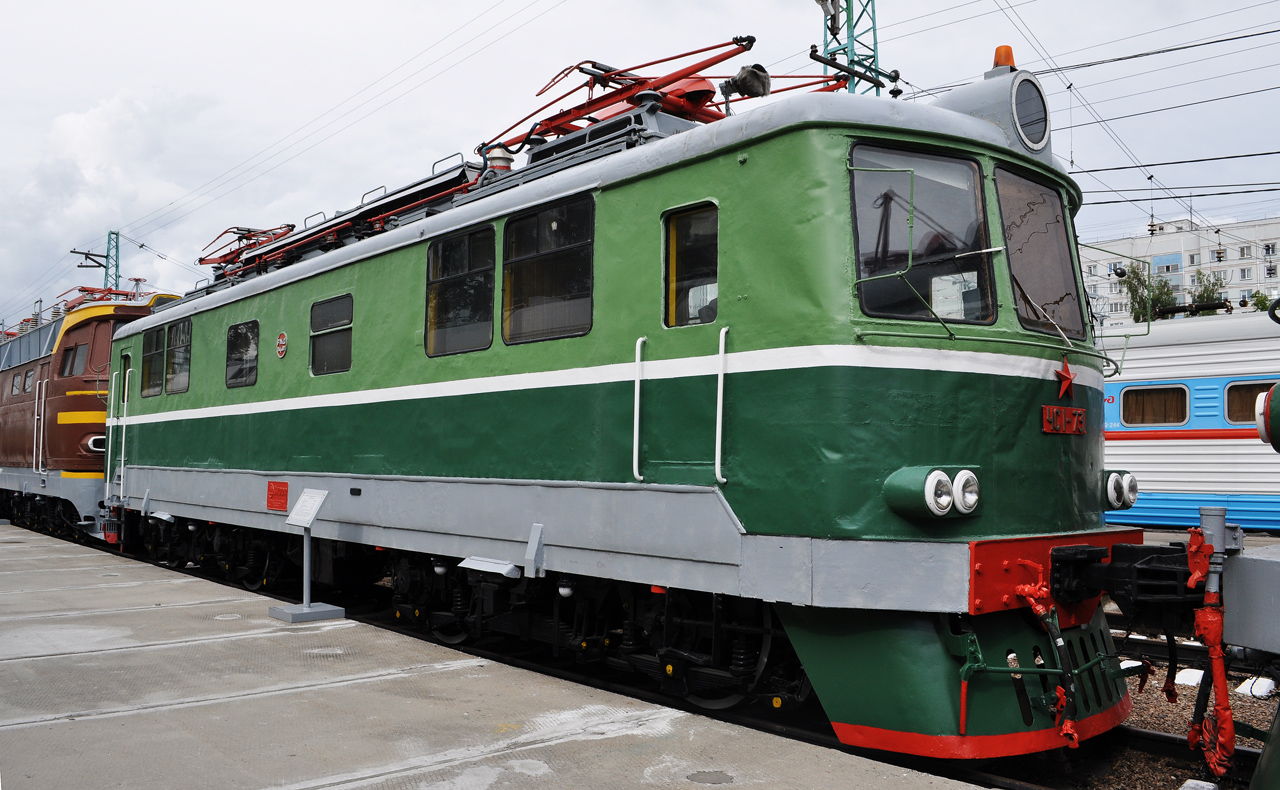
ChS1-073 at the Novosibirsk Railway museum

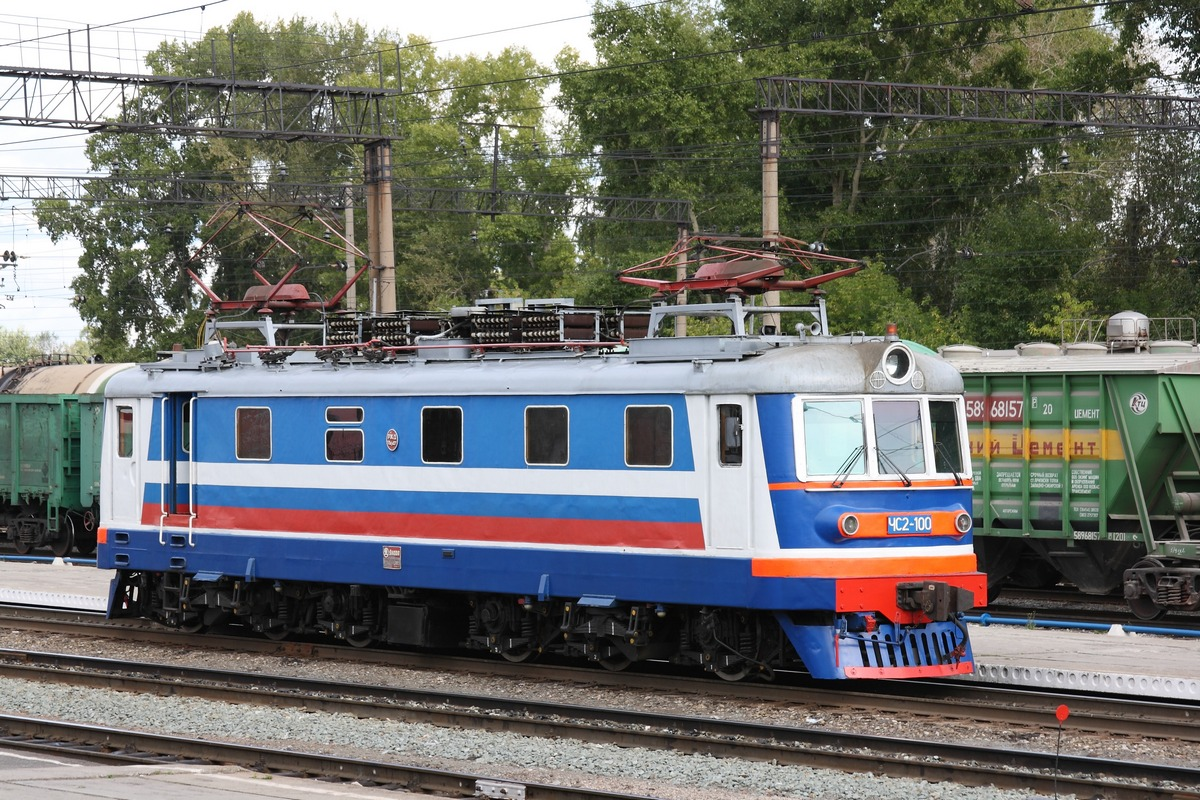
ChS2-100 in Tomsk

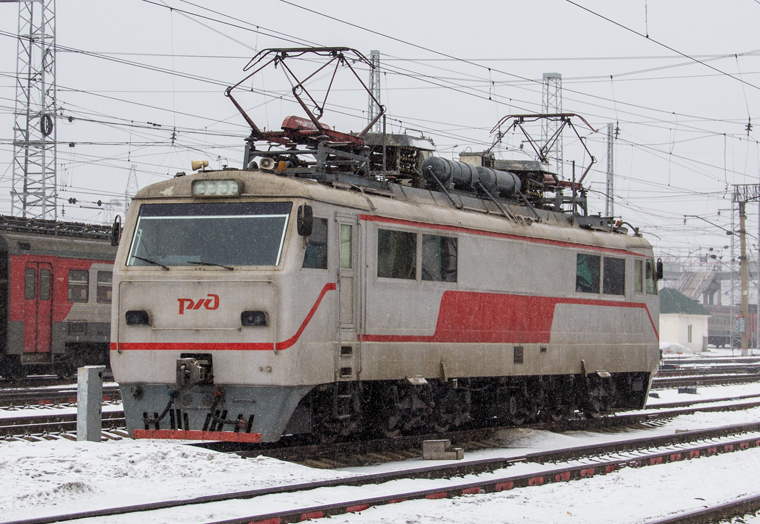
ChS2-101 with modified body in Novosibirsk

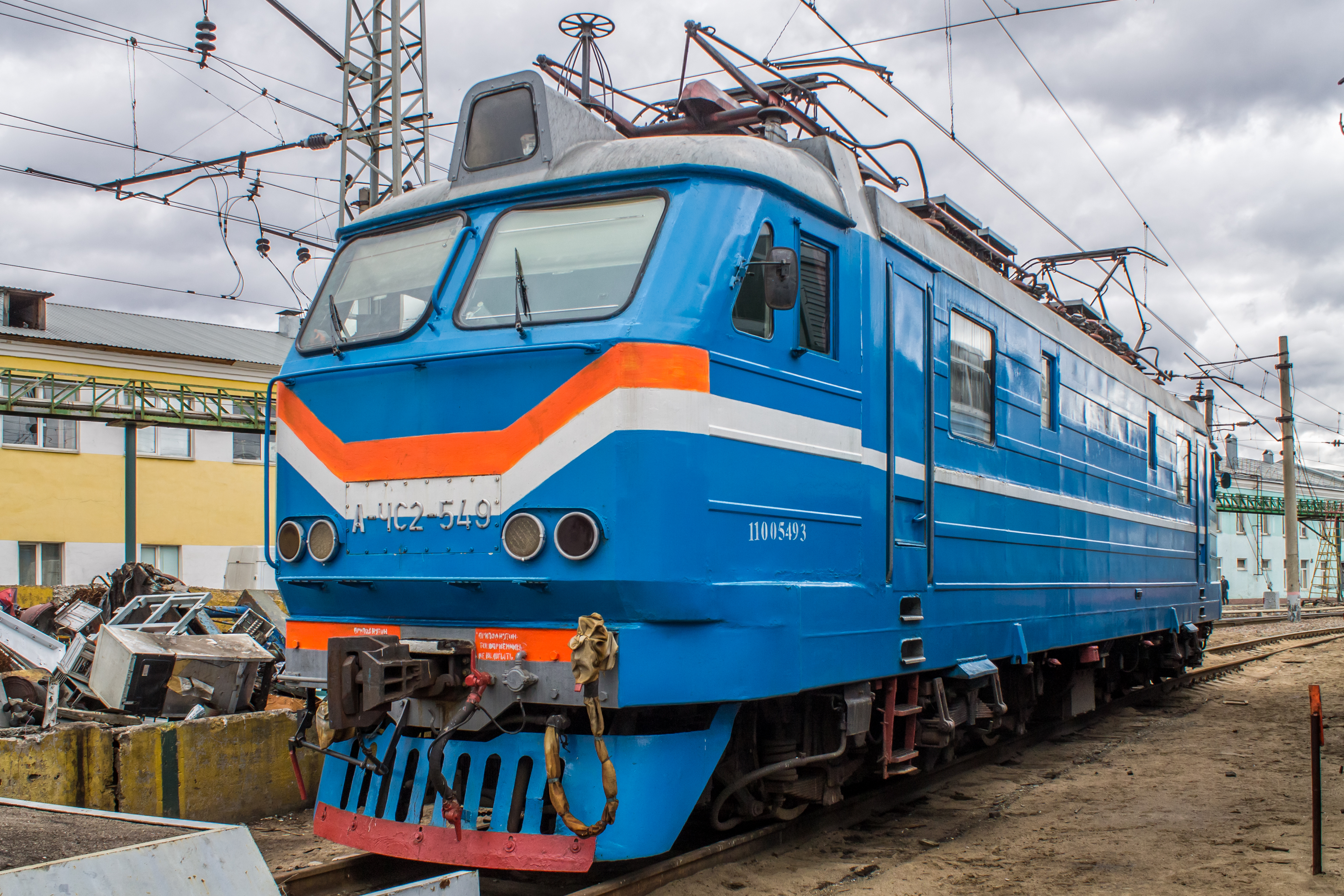
A-ChS2-549 in Moscow

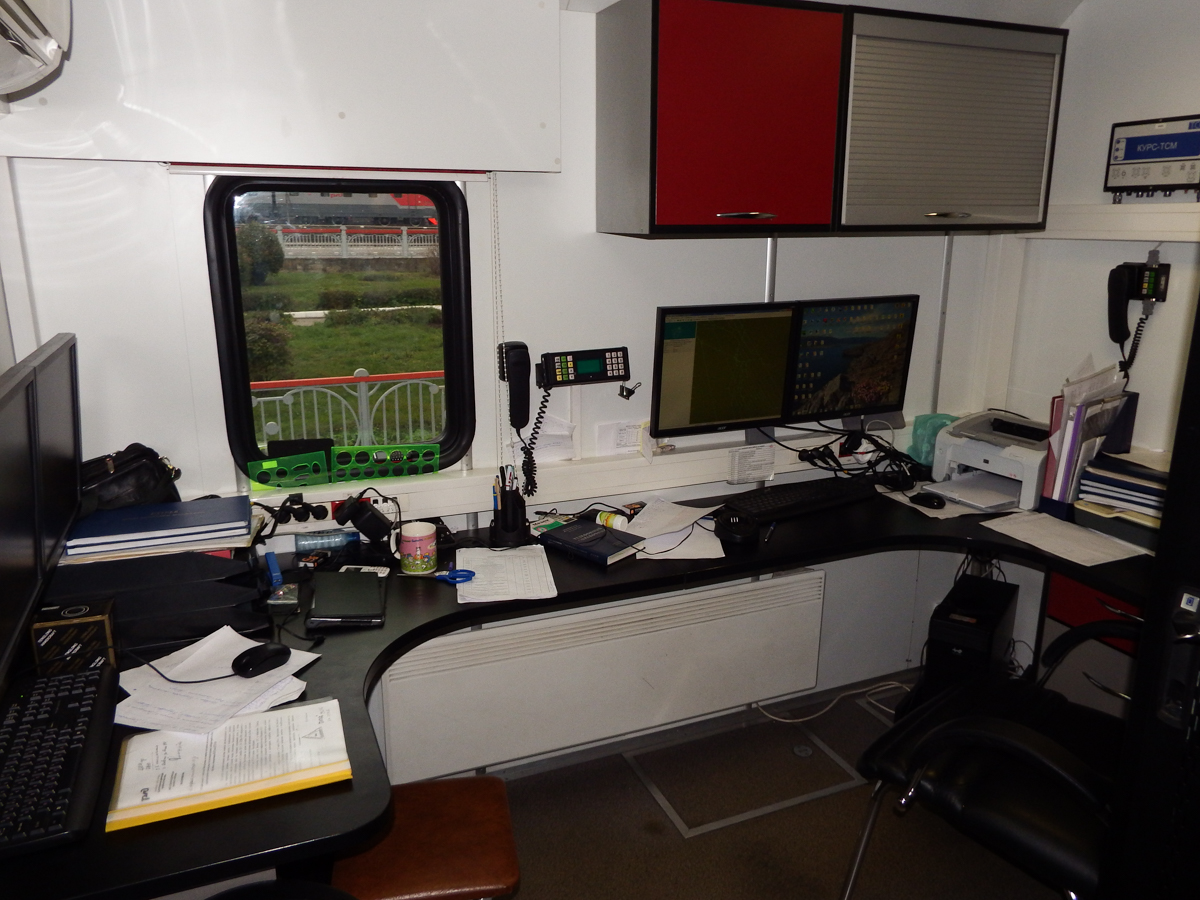
A working room inside VL11M-178 inspection locomotive

The Russian Railways also converted four two-unit locomotives into inspection locomotives, including two freight electric locomotives VL10-777 (converted in 2004 by the Chelyabinsk Repair Plant) and VL11m-178 (converted in 2012 by Tvema in Rybnoye depot), one passenger electric locomotive ChS200-008 (converted in 2012 by the Yaroslavl Locomotive Repair Plant), and one freight diesel-electric locomotive 2TE116-1447 (converted in 2014 by the Voronezh Locomotive Repair Plant). One unit of each locomotive remained a fully functional locomotive with minor upgrades, while the other unit had its power equipment, including the traction motors, completely removed, technically becoming a control car with an inspection compartment. The trailer unit of VL10-777 electric locomotive was equipped as an open seating dining car with tables, while the others were equipped with diagnostic track-measuring equipment, kitchen, working and sleeping rooms for personnel. As of 2025, only the 2TE116 diesel locomotive remains in service. The ChS200 electric locomotive is undergoing repairs. The VL10-777 burned in 2013 and scrapped in 2015, and the VL11M-178 was scrapped in 2024.

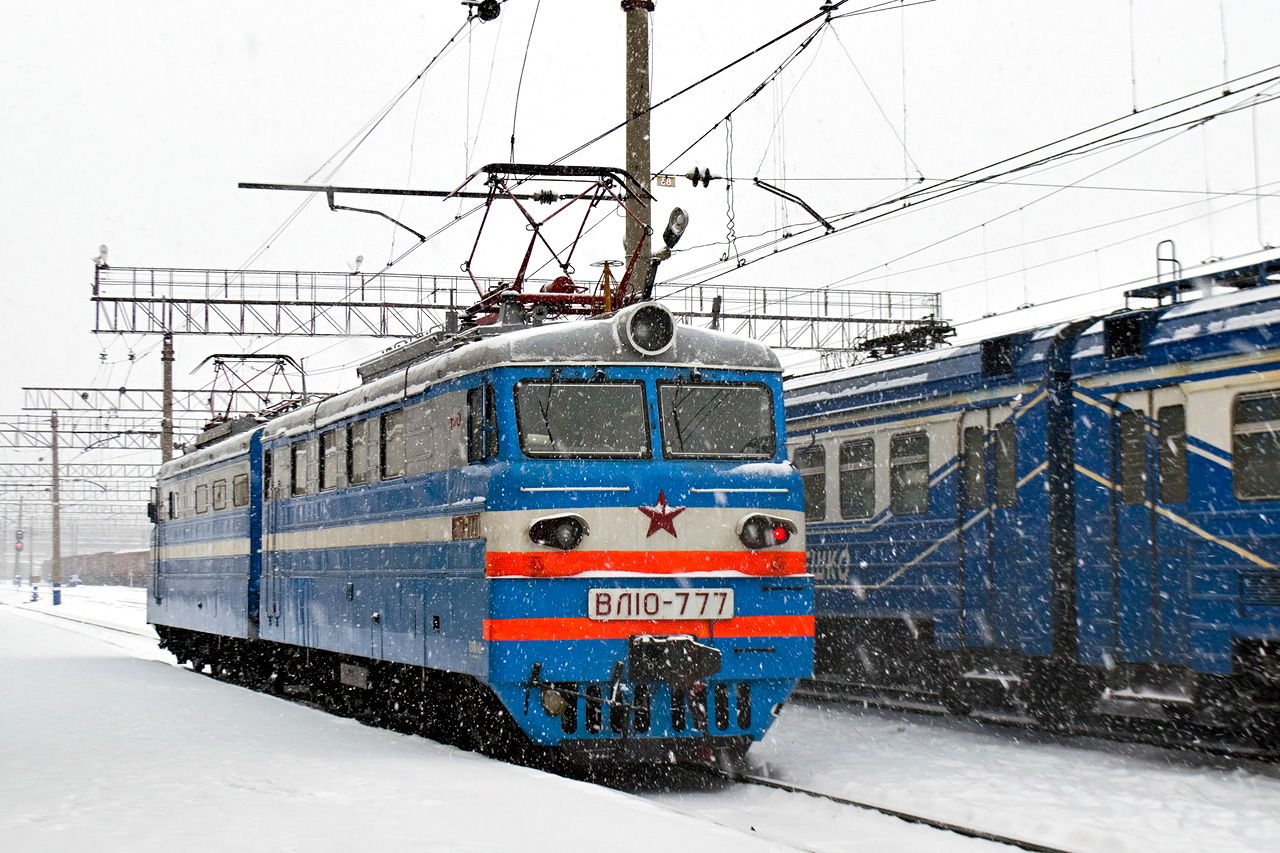
VL10-777

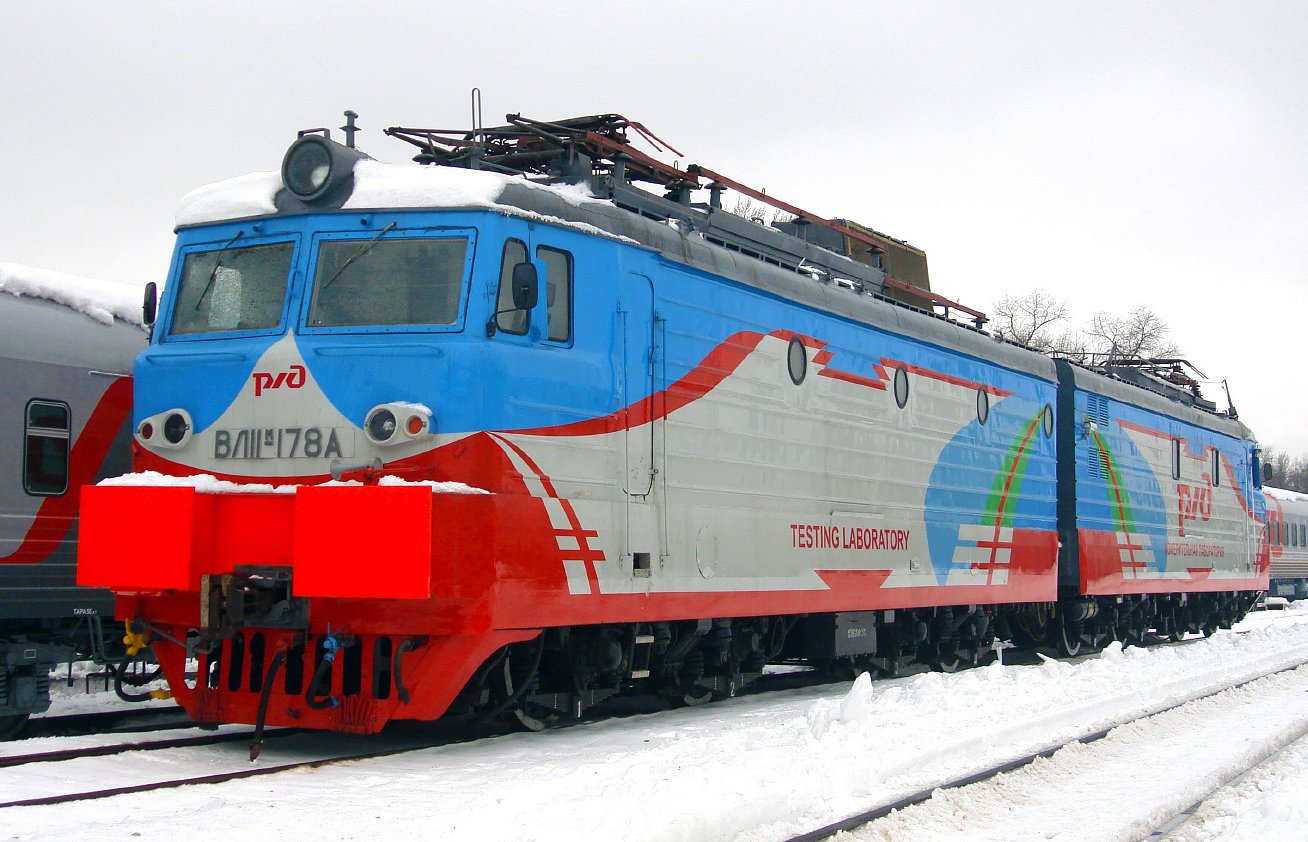
VL11m-178

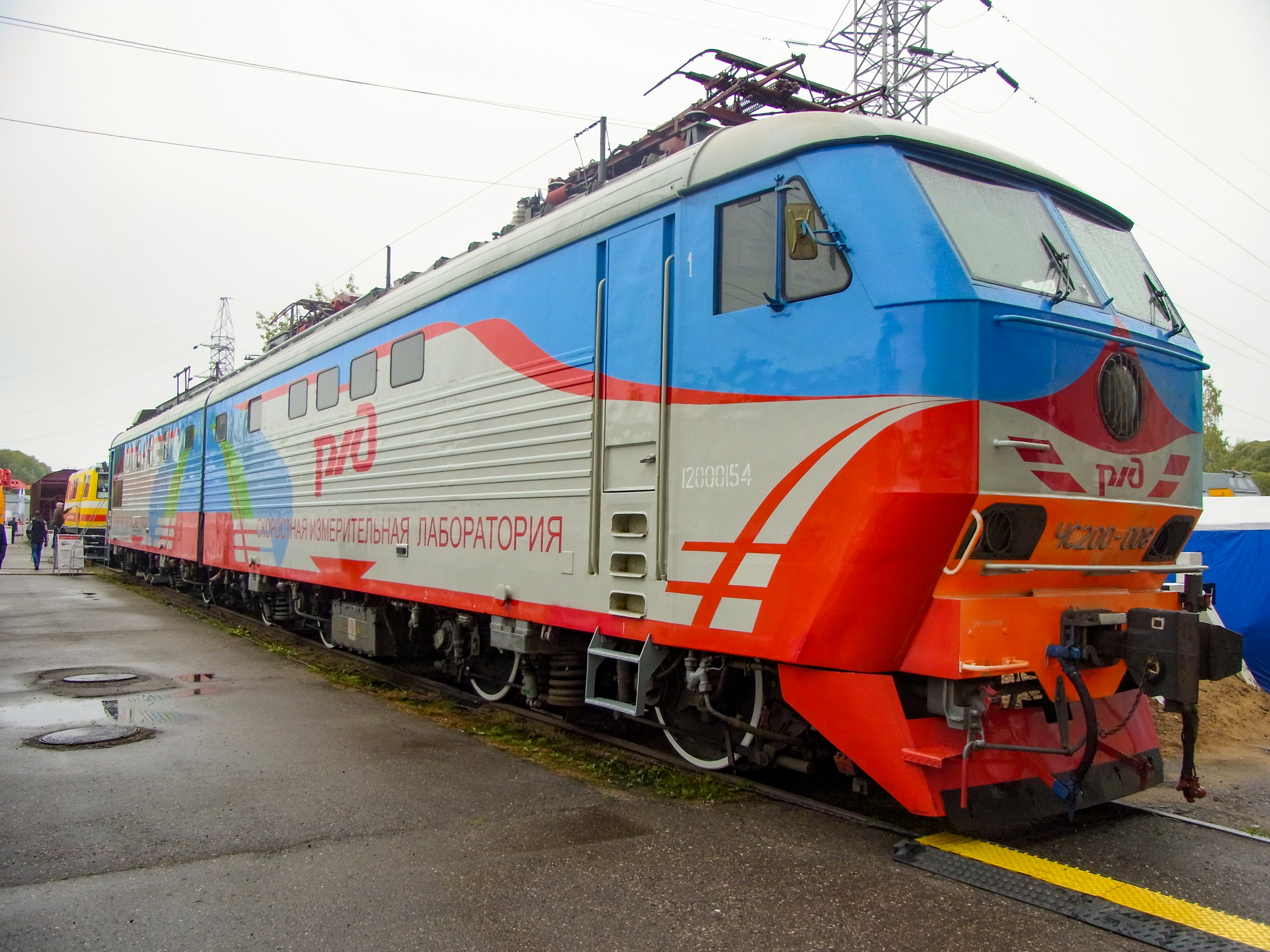
ChS200-008

=== United Kingdom ===
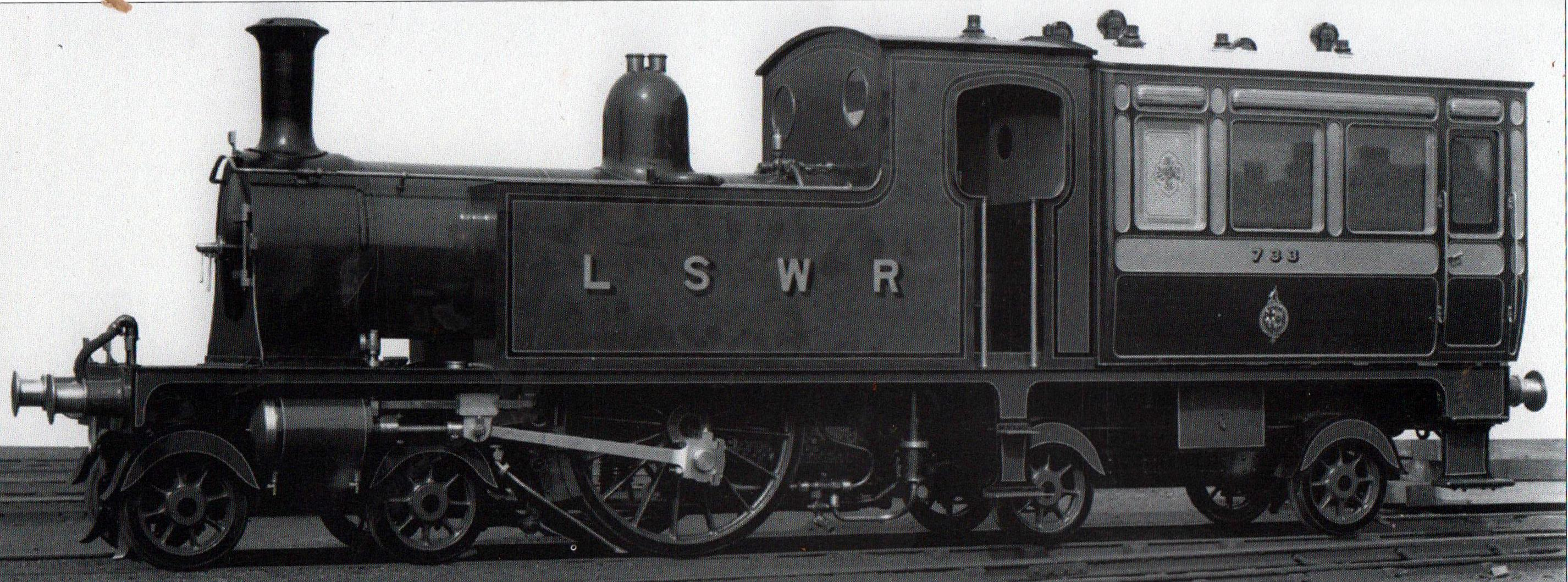
Inspection locomotive of the London and South Western Railway, nicknamed 'The Bug'.

Railway companies in the United Kingdom rarely used inspection locomotives. Instead dedicated carriages (known as Inspection Saloons) were used. These were either rebuilt from obsolete coach stock or, occasionally, were newly built. However many companies maintained dedicated locomotives to haul Inspection Saloons. These were usually elderly engines that had been famous top-rank express locomotives when new but had since been surpassed. Examples of such engines include the Caledonian Railway Single, LNWR No.3020 'Cornwall' and NER No. 66 'Aerolite'.

Dugald Drummond, when Chief Mechanical Engineer of the London and South Western Railway had a small 4-2-4T tank locomotive classed F9 with a small saloon body mounted on its rear as his personal transport around the L&SWR system on inspections and visits.

The Edinburgh and Glasgow Railway (E&GR) also had an inspection locomotive built in 1856. On 1 August 1865 the North British Railway absorbed the E&GR. The engine got the No. 312, in 1895 No. 879, in 1901 No. 1079. It was withdrawn 1911.

In 1890, the London, Brighton and South Coast Railway built an inspection locomotive called Inspector. It was withdrawn in 1899.

=== United States ===
By 1900, many railroads in the United States had inspection locomotives. A few examples:

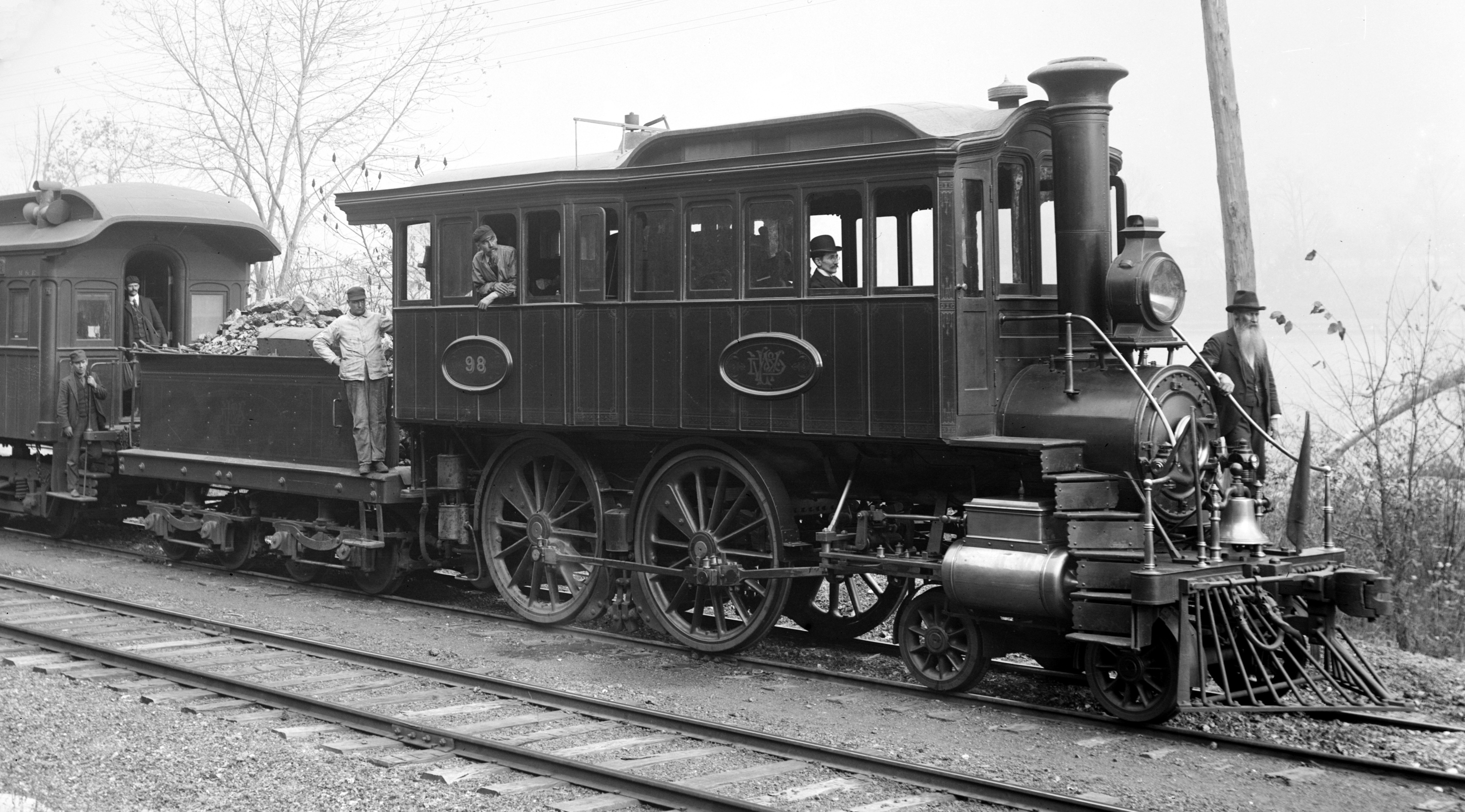
Delaware, Lackawanna and Western Railroad (around 1900)

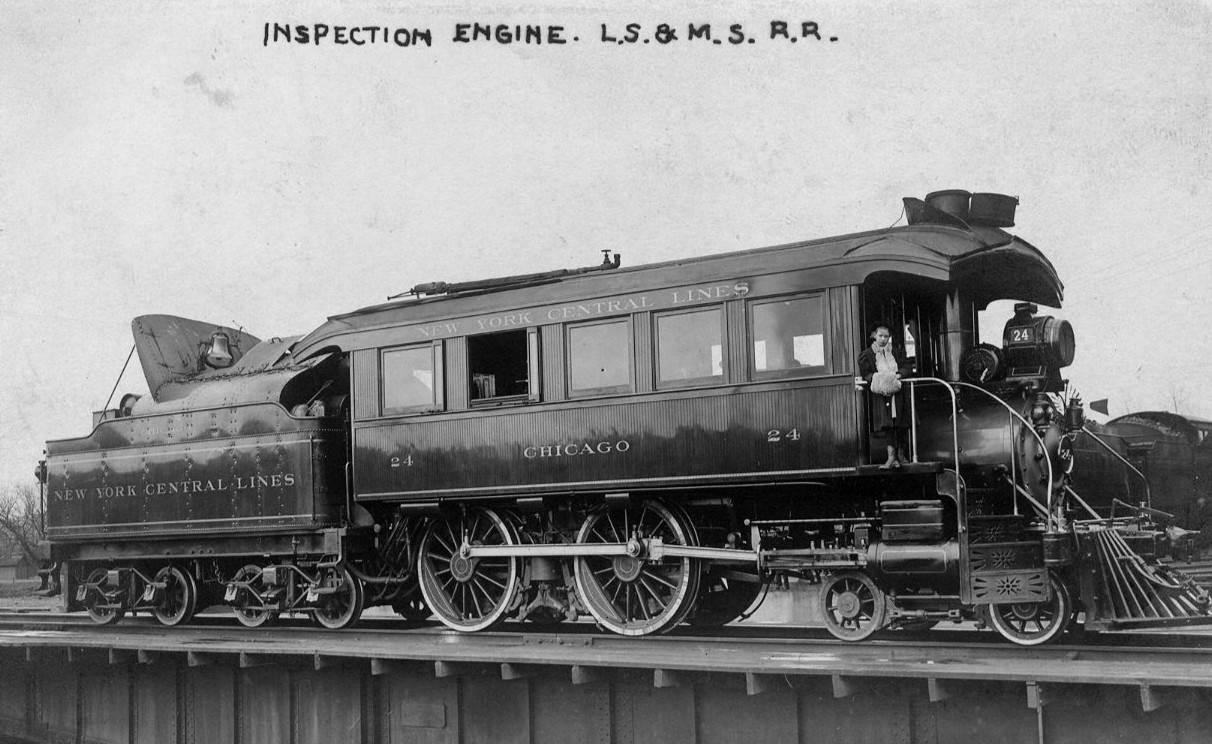
Lake Shore and Michigan Southern Railway (1910)

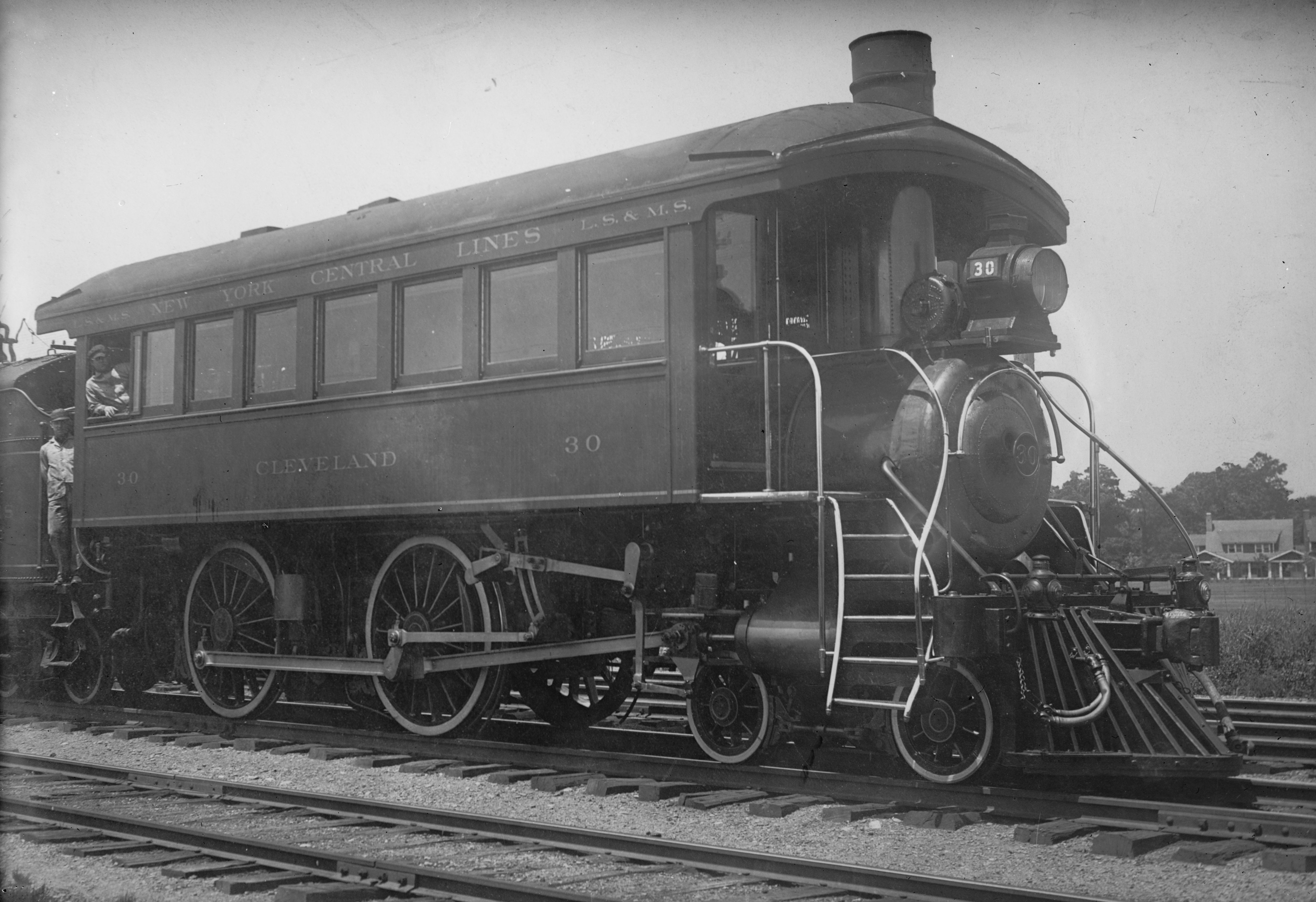
New York Central Railroad (around 1900)

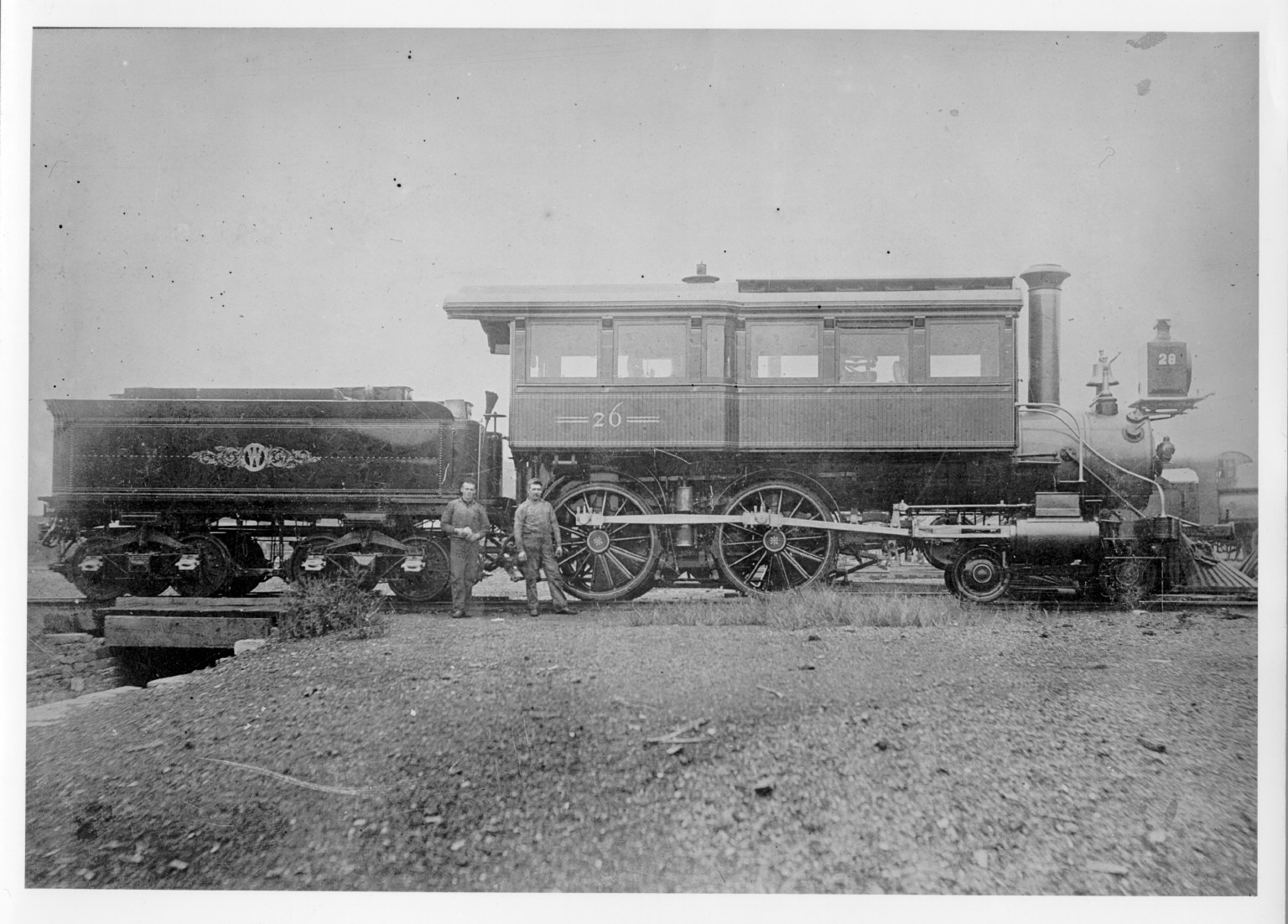
New York, Ontario and Western Railway (1893)

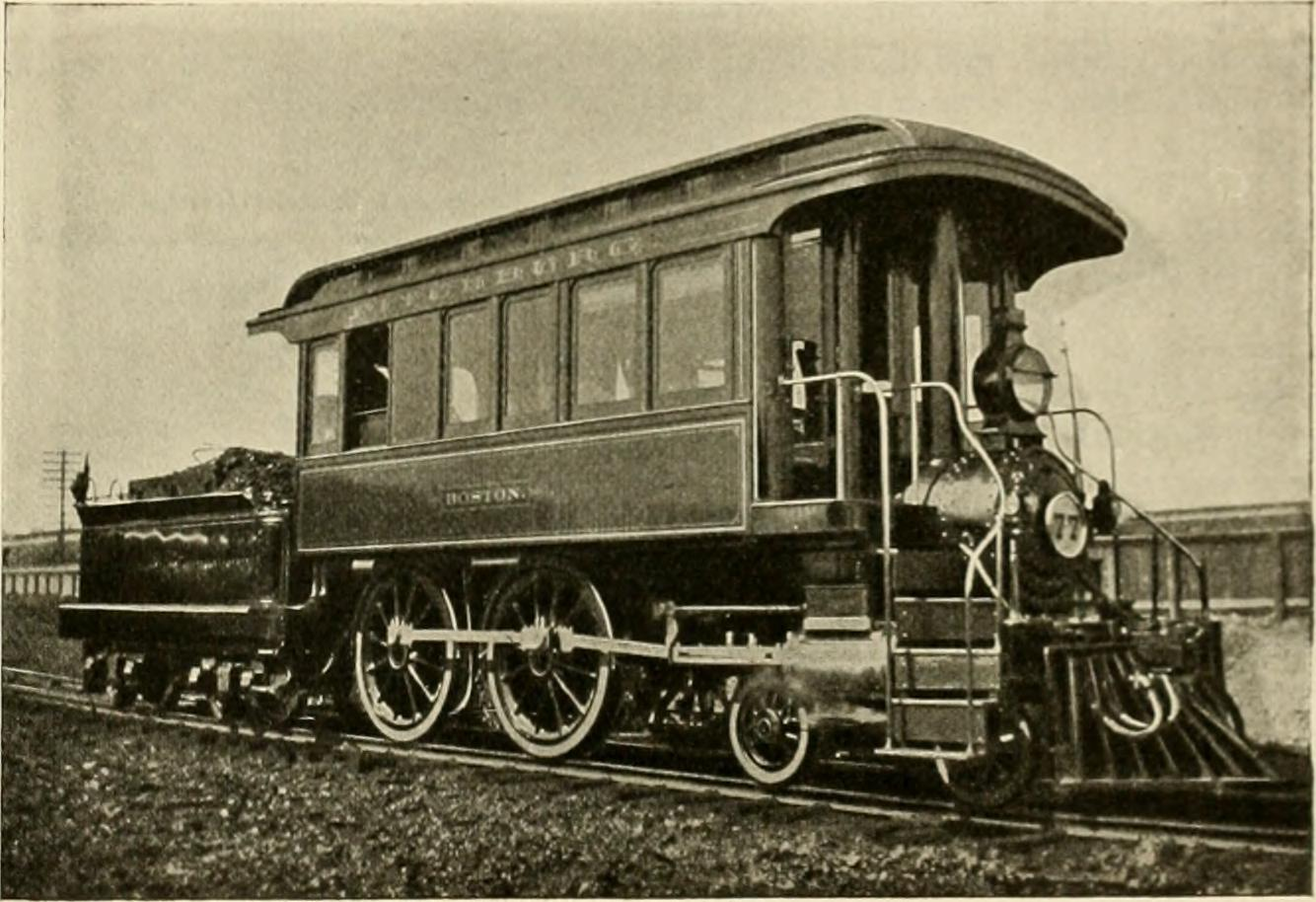
Fitchburg Railroad (1897)

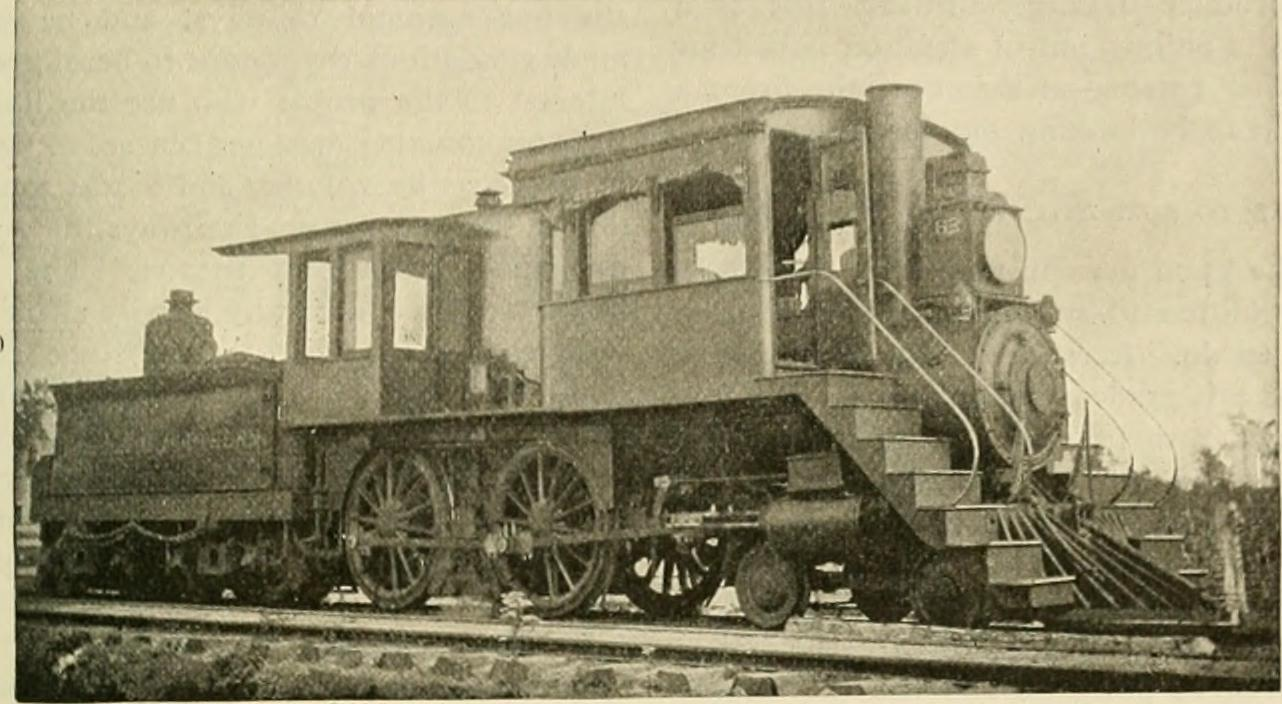
Norfolk and Southern Railroad (1897)

The only known surviving U.S. example is the Reading Railroad's "Black Diamond", a tiny 2-2-2 with fully enclosed bodywork, at the National Museum of Transportation in St. Louis, Missouri. It was used by the President of Philadelphia & Reading Coal and Iron Co. and other railroad executives on short business or inspection trips.
