= LSWR F9 class =

British locomotive

LSWR/SR F9
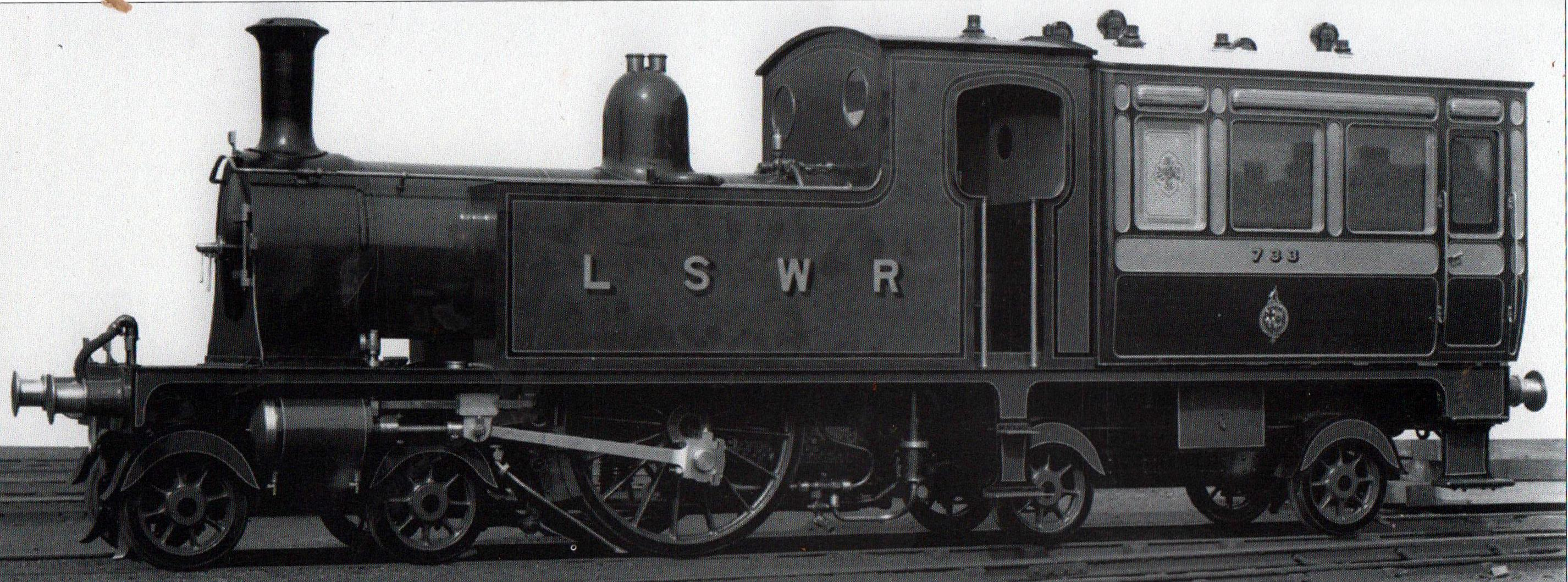
- LSWR F9 Class as built 1899
Type and origin
- Power type: Steam
- Designer: Dugald Drummond
- Builder: LSWR Nine Elms Works
- Build date: 1899
- Total produced: 1
Specifications
- Configuration
  - Whyte: 4-2-4T
- Gauge: 4 ft 8 1/2 in (1,435 mm)
- Leading dia.: 2 ft 6 in (762 mm)
- Driver dia.: 5 ft 7 in (1,702 mm)
- Trailing dia.: 2 ft 6 in (762 mm)
- Length: 35 ft 9.25 in (10.90 m)
- Loco weight: 37 long tons 8 cwt (83,800 lb or 38 t)
- Fuel type: coal
- Boiler pressure: 175 lbf/in^{2} (1.21 MPa)
- Cylinders: Two, outside
- Cylinder size: 11.5 in × 18 in (292 mm × 457 mm)
Performance figures
- Tractive effort: 5,285 lbf (23.51 kN)
Career
- Operators: London and South Western Railway, Southern Railway
- Class: F9
- Locale: Great Britain
- Withdrawn: 1940
- Disposition: Engine unit scrapped, saloon preserved as a garden shed.

The LSWR F9 class was a unique inspection locomotive and saloon designed by and for the personal use of Dugald Drummond on the London and South Western Railway (LSWR) in 1899.

== Origin and usage ==
Dugald Drummond, the Chief Mechanical Engineer of the LSWR built this locomotive to enable him and senior staff to visit all parts of the LSWR system including his frequent commutes from his home at Surbiton to the new locomotive works at Eastleigh. The locomotive was built at Nine Elms works in 1899 at a cost of £1765 (equal to £190,321.84 in 2024). It was numbered 733 and nicknamed ‘The Bug’. Drummond died in 1912 and his successor, Robert Urie, rarely used the locomotive, so it was transferred to the service stock, and used to transport members of the Engineer’s Department on inspection tours of Southampton Docks. In 1916 it was laid aside and stored at Eastleigh works until a decision was made about its future.

It was renumbered 58S in 1924, a year after it had passed into Southern Railway ownership, but was not resurrected until May 1932 when it was briefly used, together a single 6-wheeled carriage, to take parties to view the extension to Southampton Docks, then under construction. It was returned to store at Eastleigh from 1933 until 1940 when it was withdrawn from stock.

== Subsequent usage ==
The carriage unit, the cab, boiler, cylinders and driving wheels were stripped away and the frames, leading and trailing wheels were used as a means of transporting heavy loads around Eastleigh Works. The frames continued in this use until 1957 before they were scrapped.

The saloon was used as the Timber Inspector’s office in Eastleigh Carriage works until the late 1960s. Thereafter it was used as a garden shed. In the 1970s it belonged to the Hampshire Narrow Gauge Society who used it as a building on their short narrow gauge line called "Durley Light Railway". A reply to a blog post dated April 2013 states ‘the coach part of the Bug resides in the back garden of a house in Swanage and can be clearly seen from the trains on the Swanage branch that pass just a few yards from it.’

== Models ==
A model of the inspection saloon is illustrated as follows.
