= Thomas Grendon and Company =

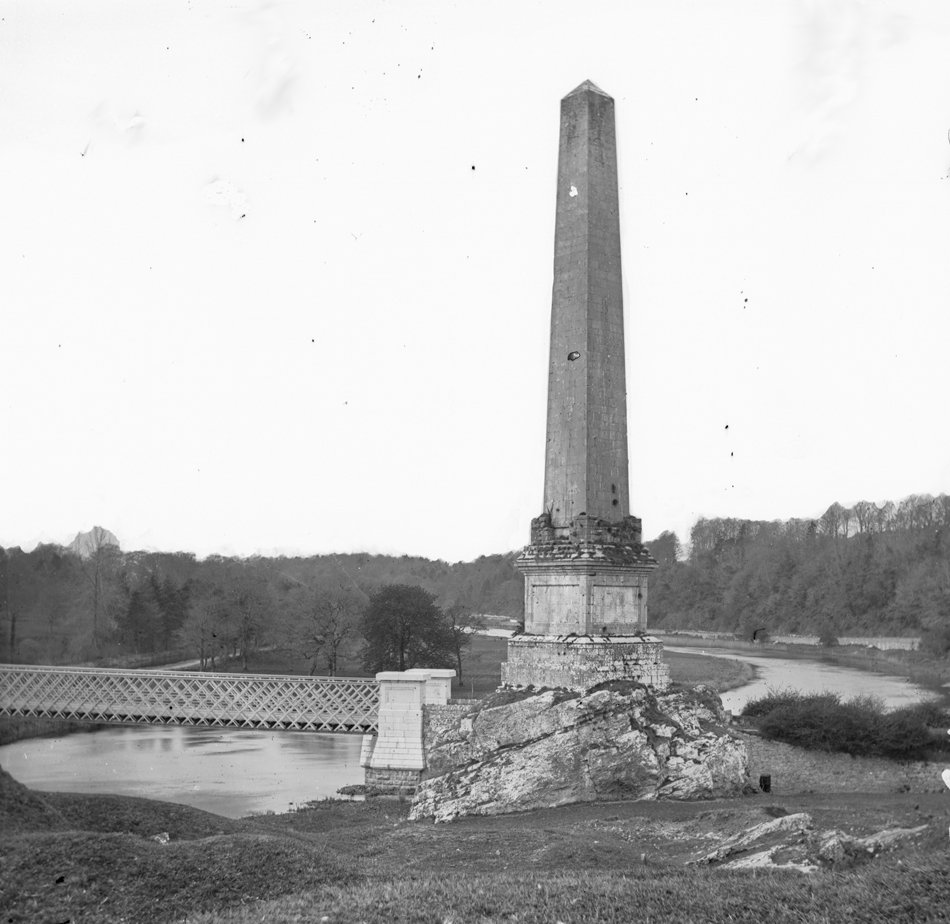
Grendons 1869 lattice iron Obelisk Bridge

Thomas Grendon and Company was an engineering company established in 1835 based in Grendons Foundry and Engineering Works, South Quay, Drogheda, Ireland.

Employing up to over 600 people, it was first forced to close in the late 1880s with contents sold in an auction in October 1890.

== Products ==
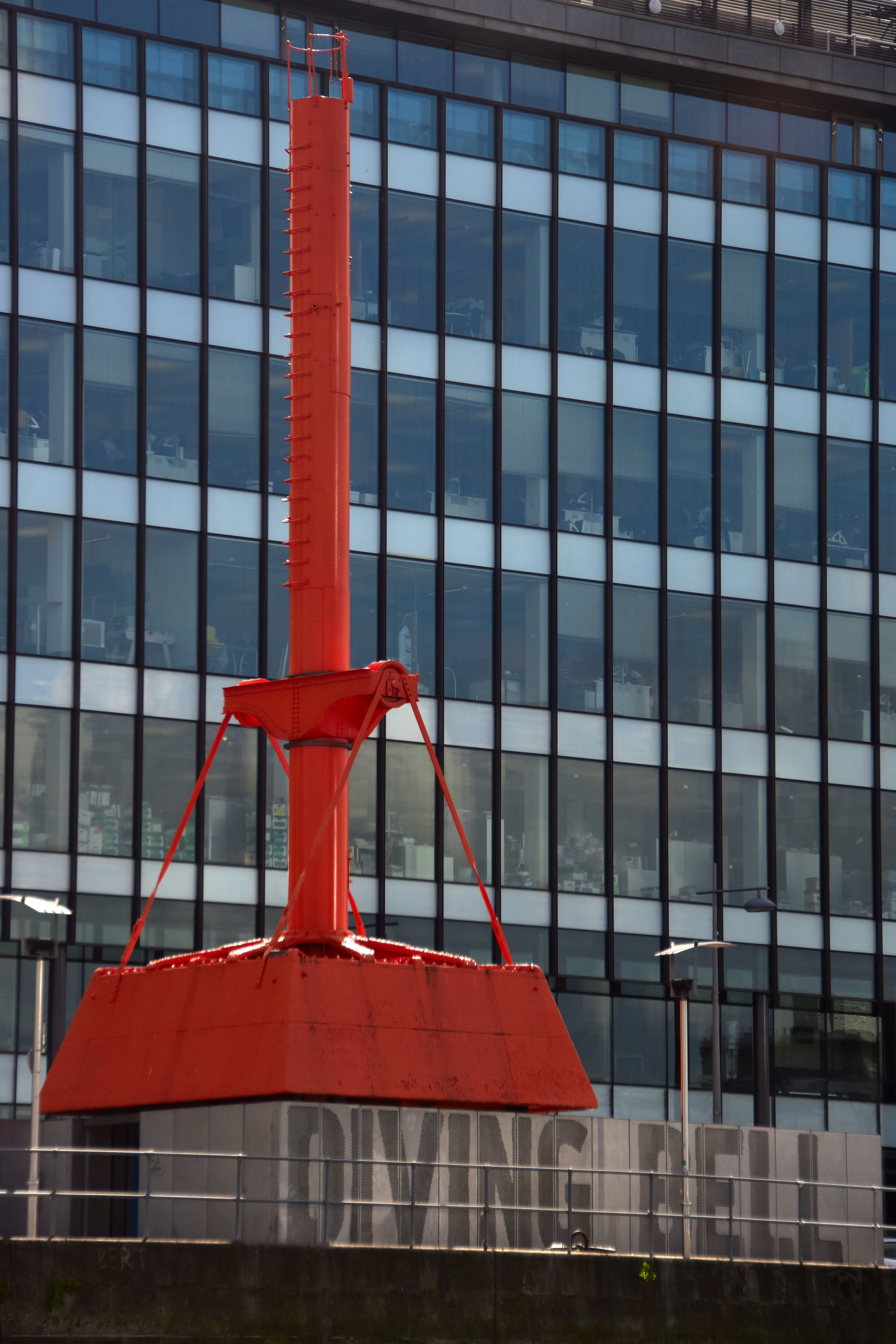
Dublin Port Diving Bell made by Grendons on display on Sir John Roberton's Quay

It produced a variety of products - from small to large. This included the manufacture of locomotives and bridges, as well as some shipbuilding. In the 1860s, the foundry produced the diving bell used in the extension of Dublin Port, which is now on display on Sir John Rogerson's Quay.

=== Bridges ===
The firm was a noted bridge builder, and its works included the 1869 lattice iron Obelisk Bridge over the River Boyne and Dominic's Bridge in Drogheda in 1863.

=== Locomotives ===
Between 1845 and 1885 the company produced about 50 locomotives, mostly for the Irish Broadguage system but also at least one for Brazil.

== Reopening ==
The foundry was re-established in 1914 as the Drogheda Ironworks and had employment for up to 70 people until closure in 1970.
