= HAZMAT Class 9 Miscellaneous =

The miscellaneous hazardous materials category encompasses all hazardous materials that do not fit one of the definitions listed in Class 1 through Class 8.

== Divisions ==
Class 9A: Lithium batteries

The miscellaneous hazardous material is a material that presents a hazard during transportation but which does not meet the definition of any other hazard class. This class includes:

1. Any material which has an anesthetic, noxious or other similar property which could cause extreme annoyance or discomfort to a flight crew member so as to prevent the correct performance of assigned duties; or
2. Any material that meets the definition in 49 CFR 171.8 for an elevated temperature material, a hazardous substance, a hazardous waste, or a marine pollutant.

A new sub-class, class 9A, has been in effect since January 1, 2017. This is limited to the labeling of the transport of lithium batteries.

== Placards ==
Hazardous Materials
Class 9: Miscellaneous

== Compatibility Table ==
Load and Segregation Chart
	Weight	1.1	1.2	1.3	1.4	1.5	1.6	2.1	2.2	2.2	2.3		3	4.1	4.2	4.3	5.1	5.2	6.1	7	8
	Weight	1.1	1.2	1.3	1.4	1.5	1.6	2.1	2.2	2.2	A	B	3	4.1	4.2	4.3	5.1	5.2	A	7	8
9																					
Key
The absence of any hazard class or division or a blank space in the table indicates that no restrictions apply.: X: These materials may not be loaded, transported, or stored together in the same transport vehicle or storage facility during the course of transportation.; O: Indicates that these materials may not be loaded, transported or stored together in the same transport vehicle or storage facility during the course of transportation, unless separated in a manner that, in the event of leakage from packages under conditions normally incident to transportation, commingling of hazardous materials would not occur.; Source: United States Code of Federal Regulations, Title 49 CFR §177.848 - Segregation of hazardous materials.

== Packing Groups ==
The packing group of a Class 9 material is as indicated in Column 5 of the 49CFR 172.101 Table.
