= WHG =

WHG may refer to:

- Walsall Housing Group, United Kingdom
- "Warehousing Godown", see Tamil Nadu Civil Supplies Corporation
- in German law, Wasserhaushaltsgesetz, see Impoundment rights
- Wellcome Centre for Human Genetics
- Western Hunter-Gatherers, component in the population genetics of Europe
