= AIR Shipper =

The AIR Shipper is a regulatory manual utilized by air shippers for shipping dangerous goods. A.I.R. Shipper is the first regulations publication recognized by the International Civil Aviation Organization and is developed in compliance with ICAO standards. A.I.R. Shipper is published by Labelmaster, a U.S.-based manufacturer of regulatory compliance products.

== See also ==
- List of UN numbers
- Packaging and labeling
- Packing groups
- UN Recommendations on the Transport of Dangerous Goods
