= Australian Dangerous Goods Code =

The Australian Dangerous Goods Code (ADGC or ADG7) is promulgated by The Advisory Committee on Transport of Dangerous Goods. The most current version is the seventh edition, 7.7 released in 2020 and mandated from 1 October 2021. Read in conjunction with accompanying national and State laws, the document creates a significant level of standardisation for the transportation of dangerous goods in Australia.

== History ==
The Australian Transport Advisory Council recognised the Advisory Committee on the Transport of Dangerous Goods (ACTDG) in 1970 to expand and harmonise standardised national requirements for safe transportation of Dangerous Goods. The ADGC is currently adopted through individual legislation in each in State and Territory in Australia drawing on national model legislation. ADG7 complies with international standards of importation and exportation of dangerous goods (United Nations Recommendations on the Transport of Dangerous Goods).

=== The National Road Transport Commission ===
Australian Transport Ministers in the early 1990s decided to establish a further national process to develop more consistent and uniform consistent dangerous goods transport requirements across the country. This project was driven by the National Road Transport Commission (NRTC), a Commonwealth statutory authority formed as a result of intergovernmental agreements entered into by the Commonwealth, States and Territories. Ian Shepherd described the commission and its processes in the following terms—

"The agreements commit each of the 9 jurisdictions to work together in the interests of reforming road transport for the operation of both heavy and light vehicles. The Act which arose as a result of those agreements established the Commission and its objectives. In broad terms, the NRTC seeks to develop national policies, procedures and laws to achieve four main things. These are:
• improved transport productivity
• improved safety
• a cleaner environment
• lower administration costs.

An important part of the Commission’s role is to establish a uniform or consistent regulatory environment for road transport across the whole nation. As an example, the dangerous goods industry is a national one. The NRTC was established to help it operate like one, unencumbered by differing jurisdictional requirements that stifle efficiency and productivity and potentially compromise safety and the environment."

=== The New Legislative Framework ===
The work of the NRTC and the Commonwealth and States and Territories led to major reform of the regulation of the transport of dangerous goods in Australia. The new framework consisted of a national Act - the Road Transport Reform (Dangerous Goods) Act 1995, national regulations - the Road Transport Reform (Dangerous Goods) Regulations 1997 and a new version - the sixth edition - of the Australian Code for the Transport of Dangerous Goods by Road and Rail.

==== The Act ====
The Road Transport Reform (Dangerous Goods) Act provided for—

"• the appointment of a Competent Authority to administer and enforce the legislation;
• the power for Regulations to be made setting out detailed matters including the identification of what “dangerous goods” come within the scope of the national regulatory regime;
• powers of authorised officers (e.g. stopping and searching vehicles, searching premises, etc);
• very serious offences such as endangering public safety and transporting on an unlicensed vehicle which can attract penalties of up to $500,000 and/or imprisonment for up to 4 years;
• the ability to be exempted from the regulations; and
• a power for a court to exclude a person from being involved in transporting dangerous goods by road."

==== The Regulations ====
The Road Transport Reform (Dangerous Goods) Regulations were arranged "...in a logical manner starting with preliminary matters and key concepts (such as bulk and packaged) and then following in the clear order of a transport operation from packaging, labelling and marking, through to transport procedures, documentation and emergencies. The duties of the various parties in a dangerous goods road transport transaction (consignor, prime contractor, loader, driver, etc) are set out in a clear, plain English style."

==== Sixth Edition of the Code ====
The sixth edition of the Code was described in the following terms—

"The final plank of the reforms is the 6th Edition of The Australian Dangerous Goods Code which was approved in late 1997. A prime difference between the 6th and 5th editions of the Code is that the new Code no longer sets out the obligations and duties of the various persons involved in the transport of dangerous goods. Those are now set out in the Regulations. The Code is now a purely technical document. However, it should be read with the Regulations. In broad terms, the Regulations establish duties of various parties while the Code sets out the technical standards and procedures. The two documents are structurally harmonised. Part 3 of the Regulations deals with packaging and the corresponding technical requirements to meet the duties of those Regulations in Part 3 of the Code. An important feature of the Code is that it ensures Australia’s technical requirements for the road transport of dangerous goods are generally consistent with the Recommendations of the United Nations Committee of Experts on the Transport of Dangerous Goods."

==== Chain of responsibility ====
The 1997 legislative framework was notable for introducing the chain of responsibility concept into Australian transport law. The concept involves the design of policy and law which allocates responsibility under threat of criminal sanction to those persons who are in the best position to prevent and manage risks. Its introduction into the dangerous goods framework was described as follows—

"A common criticism of the previous regulatory system for the transport of dangerous goods by road was that it was often unclear who was responsible for a particular aspect of a dangerous goods transport movement. Duties were imposed on a number of people without any attempt to ascertain who was in the best position to control the aspect of the transport movement which underlay the duty. And, as has often been the case in road transport law and practice, the old regime put too many duties on the easiest target – the driver of the truck carrying the goods.

The NRTC is a strong advocate of the concept of chain of responsibility. Under this concept, when a law is framed and when it is enforced it should seek to target or enable the prosecution of the person who is truly responsible for the offending conduct. In many cases, this may not be the driver of a road vehicle.

Accordingly, in framing the Regulations the Commission examined all aspects of transporting dangerous goods by road and allocated legal responsibility appropriately. One of the major parties targeted for particular duties and associated offences is the prime contractor who is broadly responsible under the legislation for the condition of the goods consigned and the provision of appropriate information. Drivers too are legally responsible for the control of the vehicle. Similarly, other parties are also singled out and made accountable under the law where appropriate. Examples of other parties given duties under the legislation are owners, importers, manufacturers, occupiers, loaders and so on.

The end result is that the prosecution net is spread much wider, certainly beyond drivers. The ability to seek out actual wrongdoers other than truck drivers is a key feature of the Commission’s work and one that we have pioneered in Australian transport law."

== Seventh Edition of the Code ==
The seventh edition of Australian Dangerous Goods Code was released in 2008. However, the sixth edition of Australian Dangerous Goods Code still applies as a substitute to the 7th edition for a period still not decided by governments. The structure of ADG6 which was established in 1998 differs from the current ADG7. Australia is establishing a separate dangerous goods regulation for road and rail transport.

== Hazard classes ==
- Class 1 Explosive substances and articles
- Class 2 Gases
- Class 3 Flammable liquids
- Class 4.1 Flammable solids, self-reactive substances and solid desensitized explosives
- Class 4.2 Substances liable to spontaneous combustion
- Class 4.3 Substances which, in contact with water, emit flammable and/or toxic gases
- Class 5.1 Oxidizing substances
- Class 5.2 Organic peroxides
- Class 6.1 Toxic substances
- Class 6.2 Infectious substances
- Class 7 Radioactive material
- Class 8 Corrosive substances
- Class 9 Miscellaneous dangerous substances and articles

Each class is assigned a 4 digit UN number. It is not typically possible to determine the hazard class of a substance from its UN number. An exception to this are Class 1 substances whose UN number will always begin with a 0. See List of UN numbers.

== See also ==
- Chain of responsibility
