= Towing =

Pulling an object

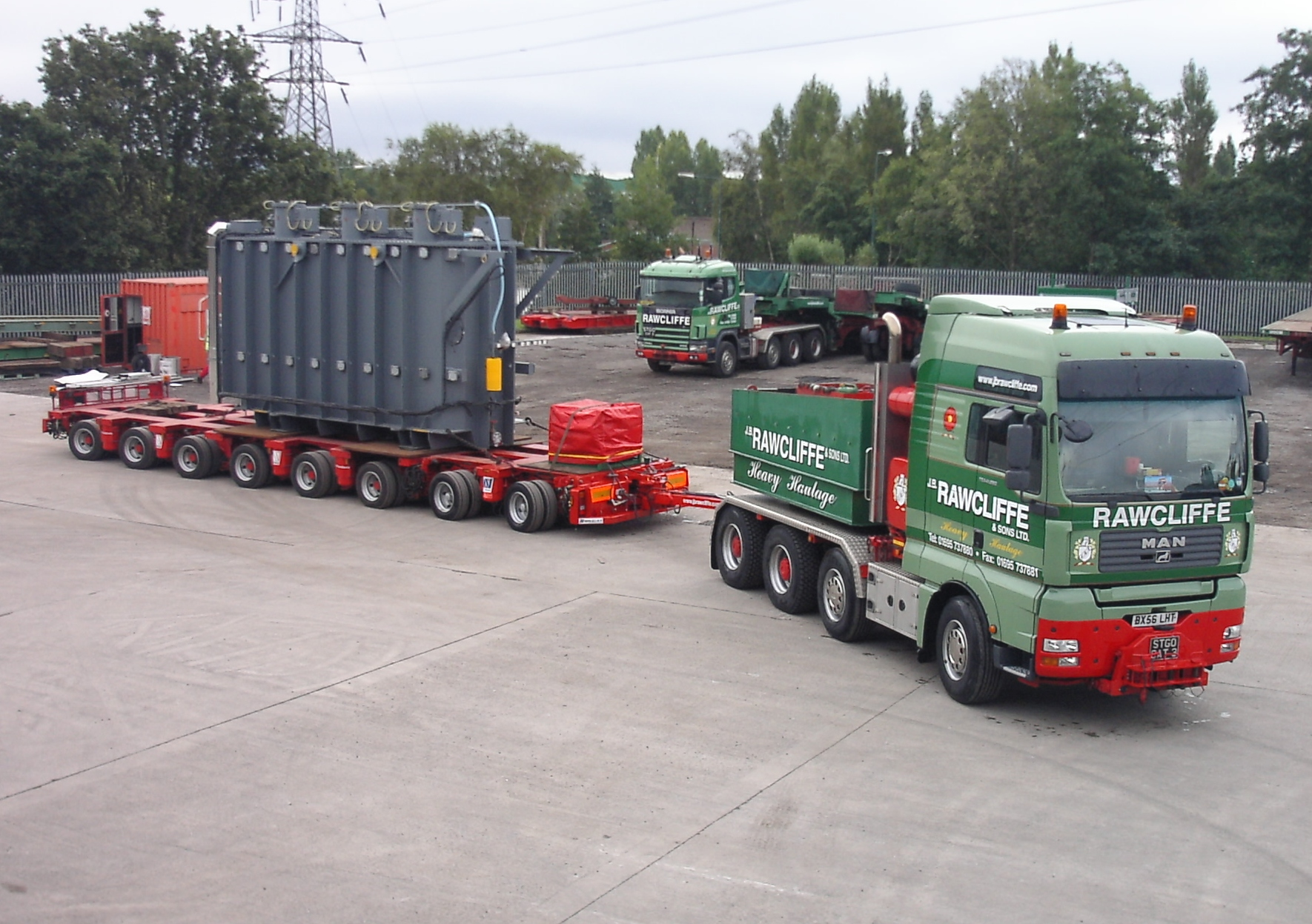
Large ballast tractor pulling a heavy load (a transformer) on a hydraulic modular trailer using a drawbar

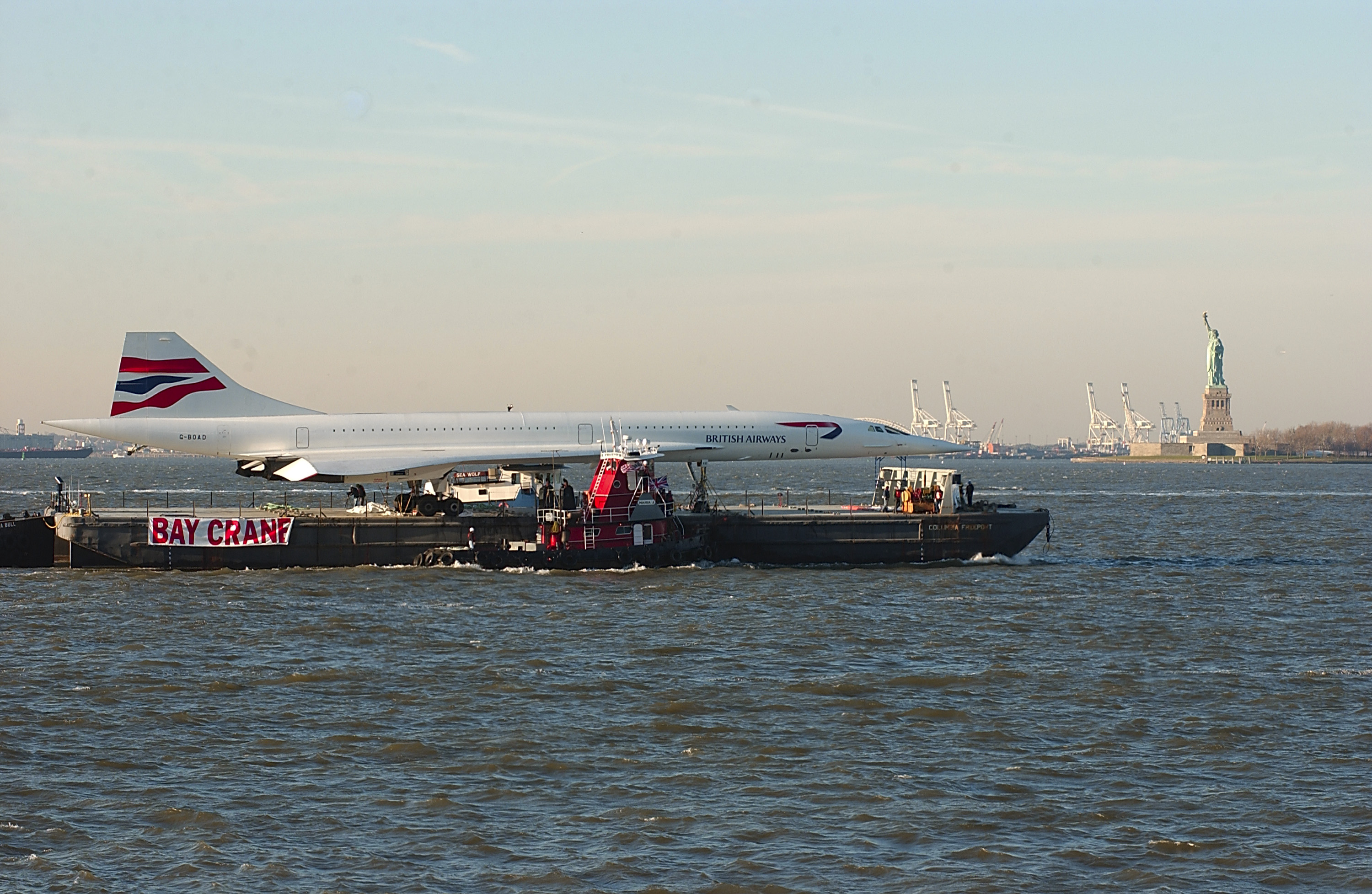
A British Airways Concorde being towed in New York City

Towing is coupling two or more objects together so that they may be pulled by a designated power source or sources. The towing source may be a motorized land vehicle, vessel, animal, or human, and the load being anything that can be pulled. These may be joined by a chain, rope, bar, hitch, three-point, fifth wheel, coupling, drawbar, integrated platform, or other means of keeping the objects together while in motion.

Towing may be as simple as a tractor pulling a tree stump. The most familiar form is the transport of disabled or otherwise indisposed vehicles by a tow truck or "wrecker". Other familiar forms are the tractor-trailer combination, and cargo or leisure vehicles coupled via ball or pintle and gudgeon trailer hitches to smaller trucks and cars. In the opposite extreme are extremely heavy duty tank recovery vehicles, and enormous ballast tractors involved in heavy hauling towing loads stretching into the millions of pounds.

Necessarily, government and towing sector standards have been developed for carriers, lighting, and coupling to ensure safety and interoperability of towing equipment.

Historically, barges were hauled along rivers or canals using tow ropes drawn by men or draught animals walking along towpaths on the banks. Later came chain boats. Today, tug boats are used to maneuver larger vessels and barges, and offshore and salvage tugs are used to tow unpowered or disabled vessels over long distances. Over thousands of years the maritime field has refined towing to a mathematics.

Aircraft can tow other aircraft as well. Troop and cargo-carrying gliders were towed behind powered aircraft, which remains a popular means of getting modern leisure gliders aloft.

== Types of trailers ==
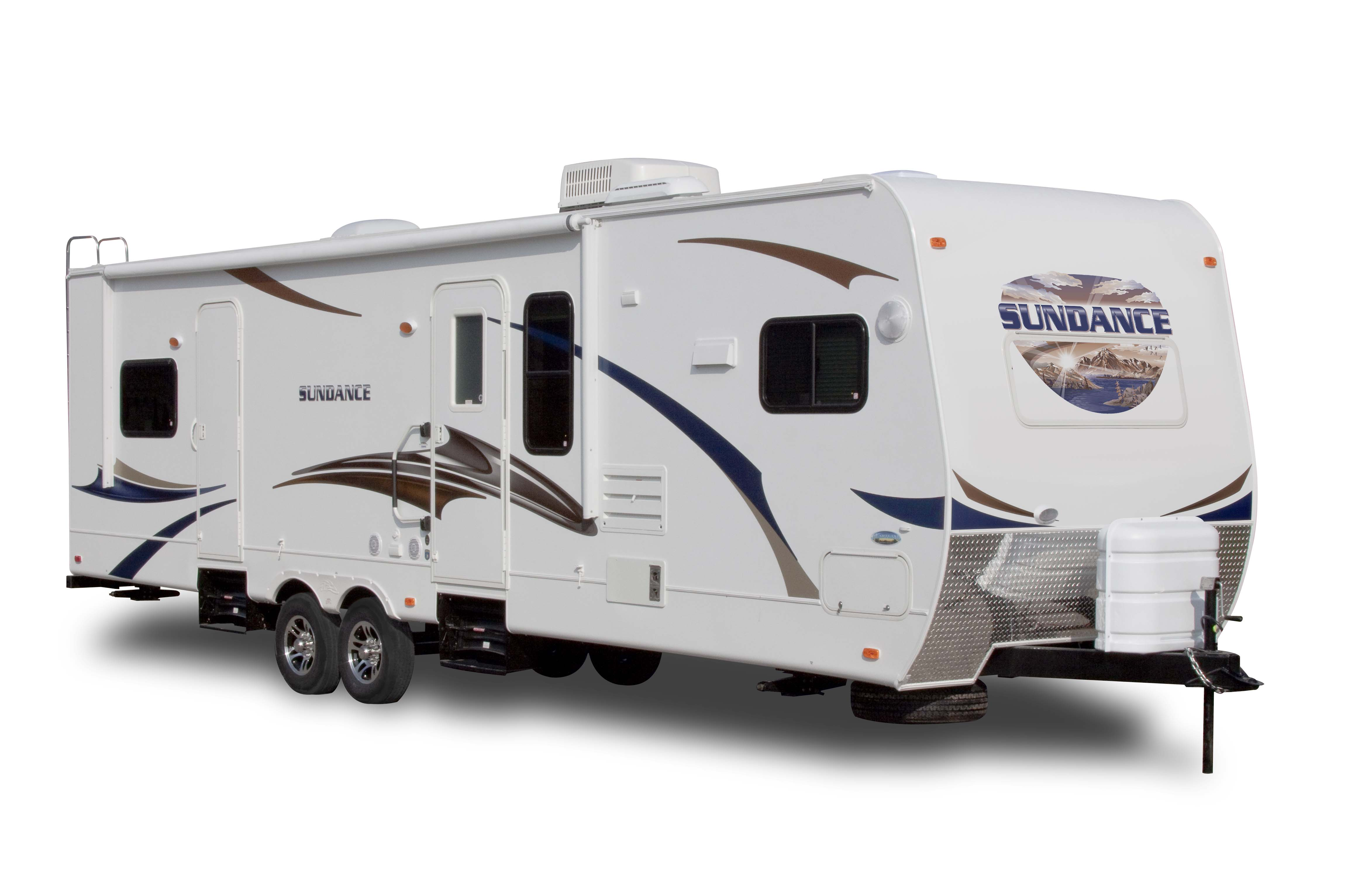
Travel trailers are a familiar type of recreational vehicle

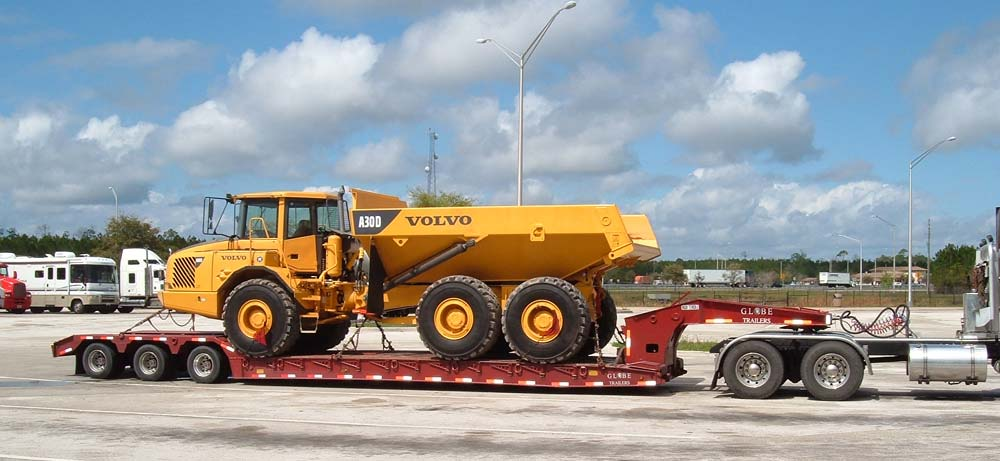
Lowboys carry very heavy loads

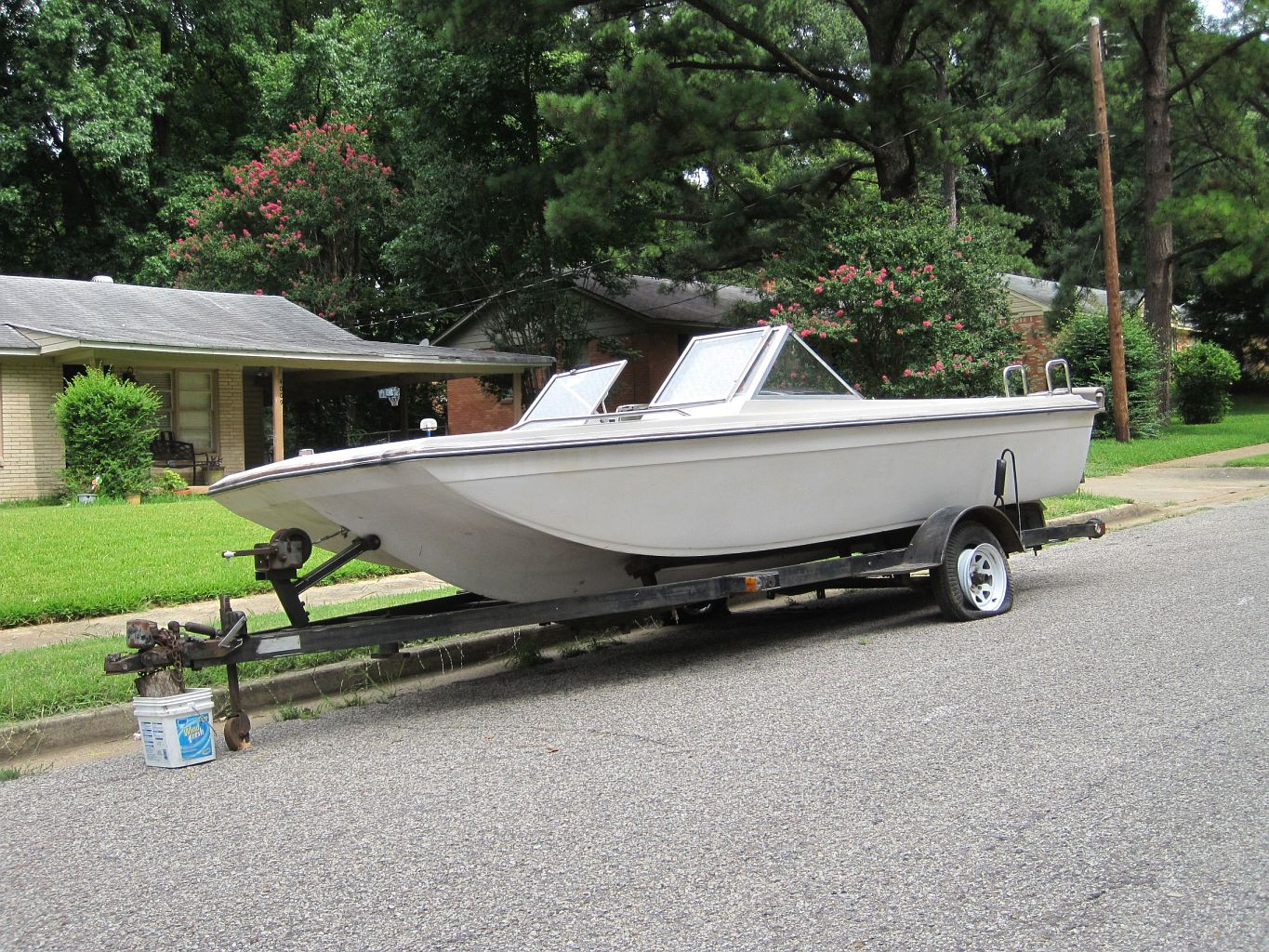
Many powerboats fit on a trailer

This section refers to the towing of a cargo-carrying device behind a truck or car.

Most trailers fit into one of three categories:

- Small trailers that attach to cars and small trucks (SUVs, minivans, etc.):
  - Small enclosed trailers are fully covered by four sides and a roof. These types of trailers are generally used for carrying livestock since they protect the contents from weather. People also rent these types of trailers for moving boxes, furniture and other materials.
  - Boat trailers are used specifically for pulling boats. These types of trailers are designed for easy loading in and out of the water and are purchased based on the specific type and style of boat they will be hauling. They are open trailers that are specially shaped to hold and secure boats; because of this specialty, they are a unique category.
  - Recreational vehicles (RV) are utility vehicles or vans that are often equipped with living facilities. While some are self-propelled (integrated truck chassis), many are designed as trailers to be attached to a trailer hitch. These trailer hitches are common on the back of many cars and trucks, and RV trailers are commonly used for camping outings or road trips. In the United Kingdom, RV trailers are known as caravans.
- Trailers designed to be hauled in an 18-wheel tractor-trailer configuration, which come in many configurations:
  - Roll trailer, Flat bed or open trailers, which are platforms with no sides or stakes. This type of trailer works well for hauling large or unconventional shaped objects. Some are small enough to be towed behind cars.
  - Tank trailers, which are trailers designed to contain liquids such as milk, water or motor fuel.
  - Container trailers are standard intermodal "boxes" that can be fitted with a dolly (wheel truck) and front stand; they can then be used in a standard tractor-trailer combination. The containers are also stacked on ships and used as railroad boxcars.
  - Non-containerized tractor-trailer boxes are also fairly common, and work much like containers, above, but frequently with the stand and dolly integrated permanently into the box.
- Trailers for speciality applications that may require a specialized vehicle, such as a farm tractor; military truck, tank, or personnel carrier; or an unusually large semi-truck. Unpowered train cars pulled behind a locomotive can also be considered in this category.
- Hydraulic modular trailer, a special platform trailer unit which feature swing axles, hydraulic suspension, independently steerable axles, two or more axle rows, compatible to join two or more units longitudinally and laterally and uses power pack unit to steer and adjust height.

== Towing safety ==
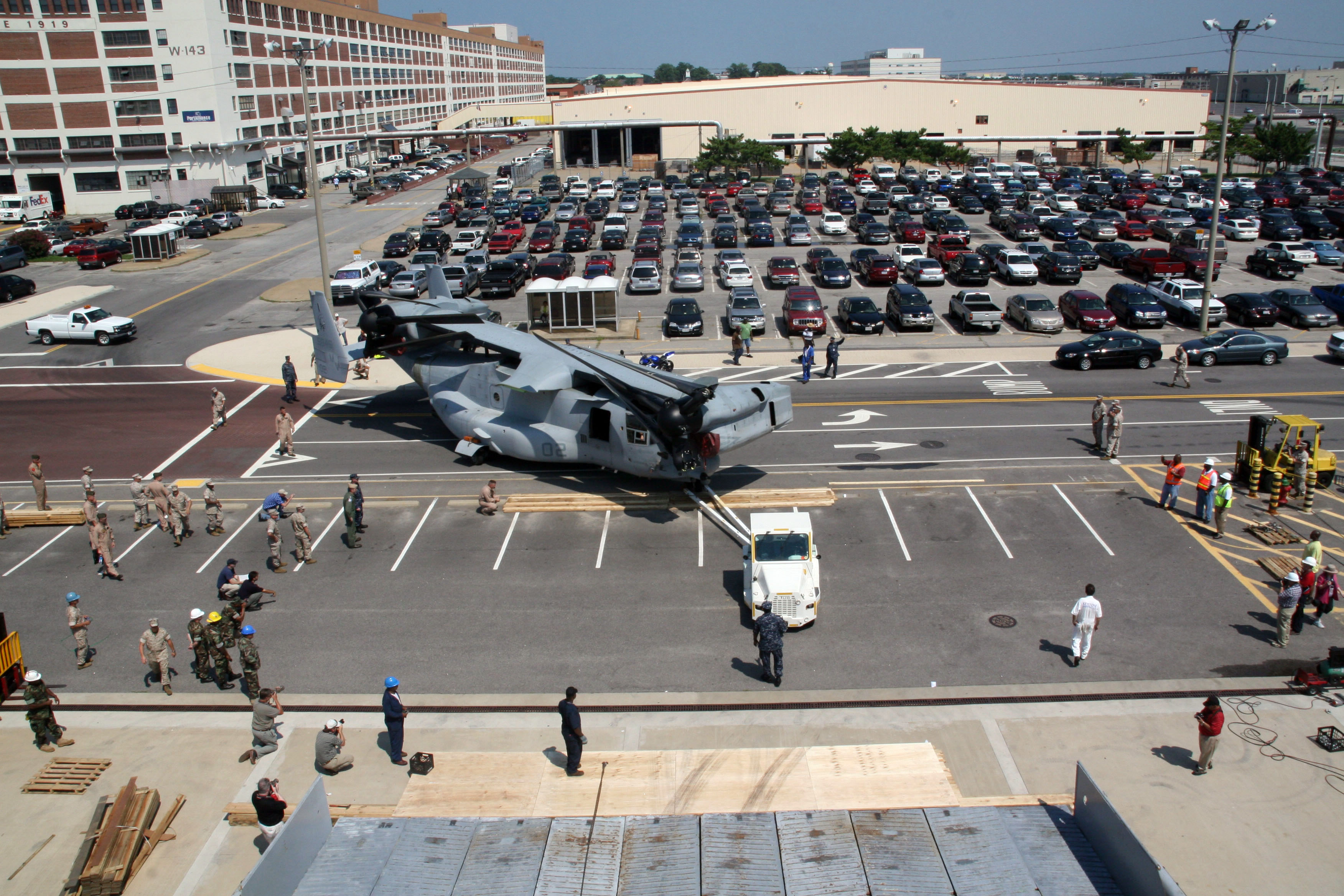
Sailors tow a V-22 Osprey to a pier at Naval Station Norfolk

There are many safety considerations to properly towing a trailer or caravan, starting with vehicle towing capacity and ranging through equalizer hitches to properly and legally connecting the safety chains.

According to the United States National Highway Traffic Safety Association, more than 65,000 crashes involving passenger vehicles towing trailers occurred in 2004 in the US, increasing nearly 20 percent from the previous year.

In 2006, Master Lock did their annual study on towing safety to see how many Americans tow their cargo correctly. The study, Towing Troubles included responses from trailer owners across the country and found that while the majority of trailer owners believe they know what they are doing when it comes to towing, most were lacking the proper education. Master Lock reported that 70 percent of trailer owners did not fully know the correct way to tow their cargo.

An important factor in towing safety is 'tongue weight', the weight with which the trailer presses down on the tow vehicle's hitch. Insufficient tongue weight can cause the trailer to sway back and forth when towed. Too much tongue weight can cause problems with the tow vehicle.

== Towbar wiring ==
=== Vehicle-specific ===
Of the many cars fitted with towbars, most are likely to have fitted towing electrics which are 'hidden' from the car.

Since the early 2000s, vehicle technology advancements have introduced CAN bus network systems which allowed the interaction of different systems, and also the detection of a trailer or caravan. In some cases, the manufacturers have not only designed automobiles to sense the presence of a trailer, but they have also added enhanced new features within the systems connected to the network. This actually makes it important that these particular vehicles can "see" the trailer or caravan. A few of these new features are for safety and stability, but most are merely convenience features, such as automatically switching off the rear fog light and parking sensors.

The main new safety feature, appearing now on some cars, is the trailer stability program (TSP), which automatically turns on when a trailer is detected in the network through the dedicated sensors. These systems can detect the "snaking" of a trailer or caravan and counteract it by braking individual wheels, reducing engine torque and slowing the vehicle down. Activation of TSP normally requires a vehicle-specific wiring loom to be installed.

Some of the advanced systems being introduced in certain vehicles, which may make use of detecting the presence of a trailer, are: lane-change assistant, brake electronics, adaptive cruise control, suspension system (ASS), engine electronics, engine cooling system, parking aids, and reversing camera.

Some suspension systems can now detect a trailer and allow for a more level towing adjustment when the load is applied on the towing hitch. ACC (adaptive cruise control) systems are meant to 'detect' a trailer to allow for a greater braking distance between vehicles. Bypassing such vehicles' trailer detection systems may cause problems, as these vehicles may be designed to behave in a different way when a trailer is attached.

Some manufacturers either put a prepared connector in the vehicle which is a preparation on the network (Ford, Volvo) to accept a specially designed towing module, or have designed the trailer to be 'detected' through connections directly onto the databus (VAG, BMW). With such connections the vehicle will know when a trailer plug is connected to the socket.

On vehicles that do not have safety features that depend on the vehicle sensing the presence of a trailer, bypass systems, properly installed by expert fitters, are very efficient and cost-effective alternatives to expensive OEM and other dedicated kits. All bypass kits will be type approved for use on vehicles. They have the built-in advantage of completely isolating the trailer from the vehicle's lighting system, thus protecting against damage to the car caused by any failure within the trailer's wiring. However, a number of manufacturers do not recommend connections to be made on the lighting harnesses.

=== Universal by-pass electronics ===
This system is used to protect the car's lighting systems from potential damage if wiring in a trailer should malfunction. Such installations are in very wide use. Bypass systems are found both in "universal" (non vehicle-dedicated) systems and in dedicated and OEM systems. It works by taking a small current signal from the vehicle's lighting harness to trigger a relay and send a direct power supply to the towing socket. It does not communicate with the vehicle and will not activate any safety or convenience systems. It has the built-in advantage of isolating the trailer wiring from that of the towing vehicle and thus preventing overloading the vehicle's own lighting harness which may be minimal gauge cabling. The connection onto this harness will cause damage if solder or crimp connectors are used. However, by-pass systems should protect the car's electrical modules from damage should the wiring in a towed trailer malfunction. It is not advised for use in cars that depend on sensing the presence of a trailer to activate towing-related safety features within the car. In addition to this, there are a number of vehicle manufacturers that do not recommend or actually ban any connections to be made from the vehicle lighting harness.

=== 12N, 12S or 13-pin sockets ===
12N is the designation for the older 7-pin lighting socket conforming to ISO 1724, used when towing just a trailer or caravan (without the need for charge or fridge functions). In the United Kingdom, it has all the functions of the rear lights on a vehicle except for reverse. These sockets are not waterproof and suffer from "pin burn-out" when worn.

12S is an additional 7-pin socket conforming to ISO 3732, mainly used when towing caravans. It consists of a permanent 12 V power supply, and usually a switched 12 V power supply for the fridge (UK). It also contains a feed for the reverse lights on the caravan.

ISO 11446 is the 13-pin standard socket being fitted for all new UK caravans and trailers sold from 2009 onwards. It can be wired with the same functions as both the 12N and 12S sockets, or with just the lighting functions including reverse (required on all trailers and caravans from October 2012). The socket has been designed to be waterproof, easy to fit and remove (twist operation), the same size as one 12N socket (ideal for detachable towbars as unobtrusive), and with good fitting quality terminals that avoid any pin burnout or voltage failure.

== Towing capacity ==
A Morris C8 towing a 25-pounder

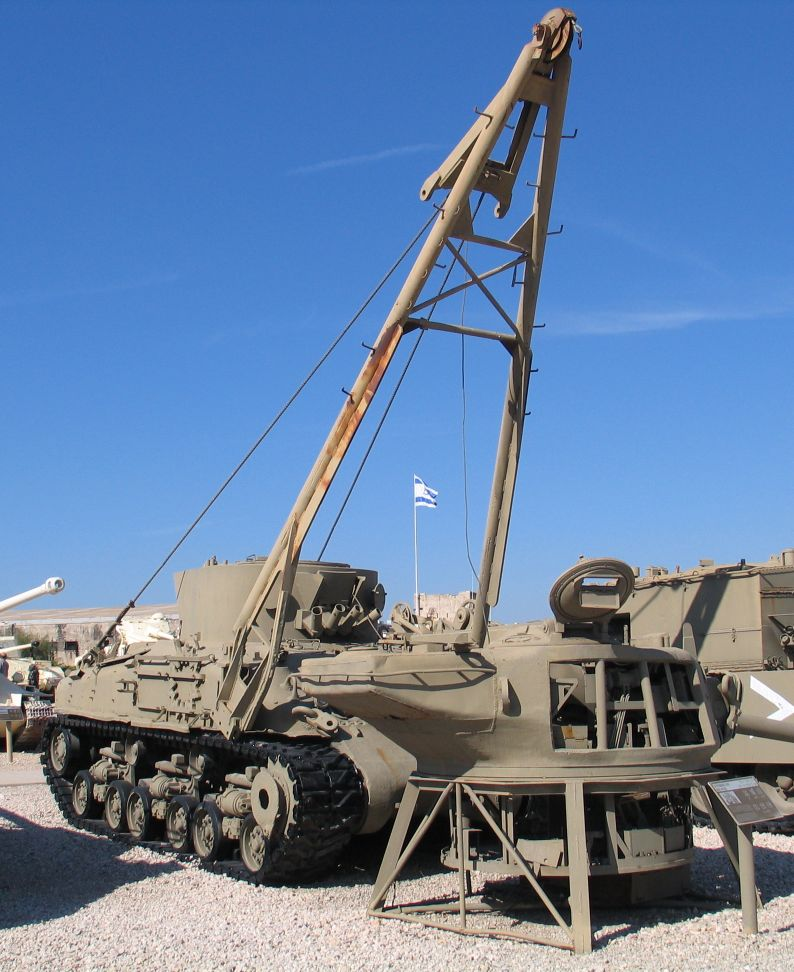
Tank recovery vehicles are designed to pull very heavy loads in all conditions, including battle

Towing capacity is a measure describing the upper limit to the weight of a trailer a vehicle can tow and may be expressed in pounds or kilograms. Some countries require that signs indicating the maximum trailer weight (and in some cases, length) be posted on trucks and buses close to the coupling device. Towing capacity may be lower as declared due to limitation imposed by the cooling system.

For cars and light trucks, towing is accomplished via a trailer hitch. In addition to the vehicle limits, the hitch assembly may have its own set of limits, including tongue weight (the amount of weight that presses downward on the hitch) and trailer weight (the full weight of the trailer, including contents). When the hitch is a factory option, the hitch capacity is usually stated in the vehicle documentation as a towing specification, and not be otherwise marked on the vehicle.

Towing capacity may either refer to braked or unbraked towing capacity.

=== Braked towing capacity ===
Braked towing capacity is the towing capacity of a vehicle if the trailer being towed has its own braking system, typically connected to the vehicle's braking system via the trailer cable. Braked towing capacity is typically significantly greater than unbraked towing capacity. Towing capacity may be measured according to the SAE standard J2807.

=== Unbraked towing capacity ===
Unbraked towing capacity is the towing capacity of a vehicle towing a trailer that does not have its own braking system.

== Types of towing hitches ==
There are many forms of tow hitch, including a ball hitch, tow bar, pintle and lunette ring, three-point, fifth wheel, coupling, and drawbar, among others.

The tow-ball is popular for lighter loads, readily allowing swivelling and articulation of a trailer. A tow pin and jaw with a trailer loop are often used for large or agricultural vehicles where slack in the pivot pin allows the same movements. A pintle and lunette is a very heavy duty hitching combination used in construction and the military.

In the case of towing hitches designed to carry other vehicles, there are more specialized types, described immediately below.

== Towing of vehicles ==
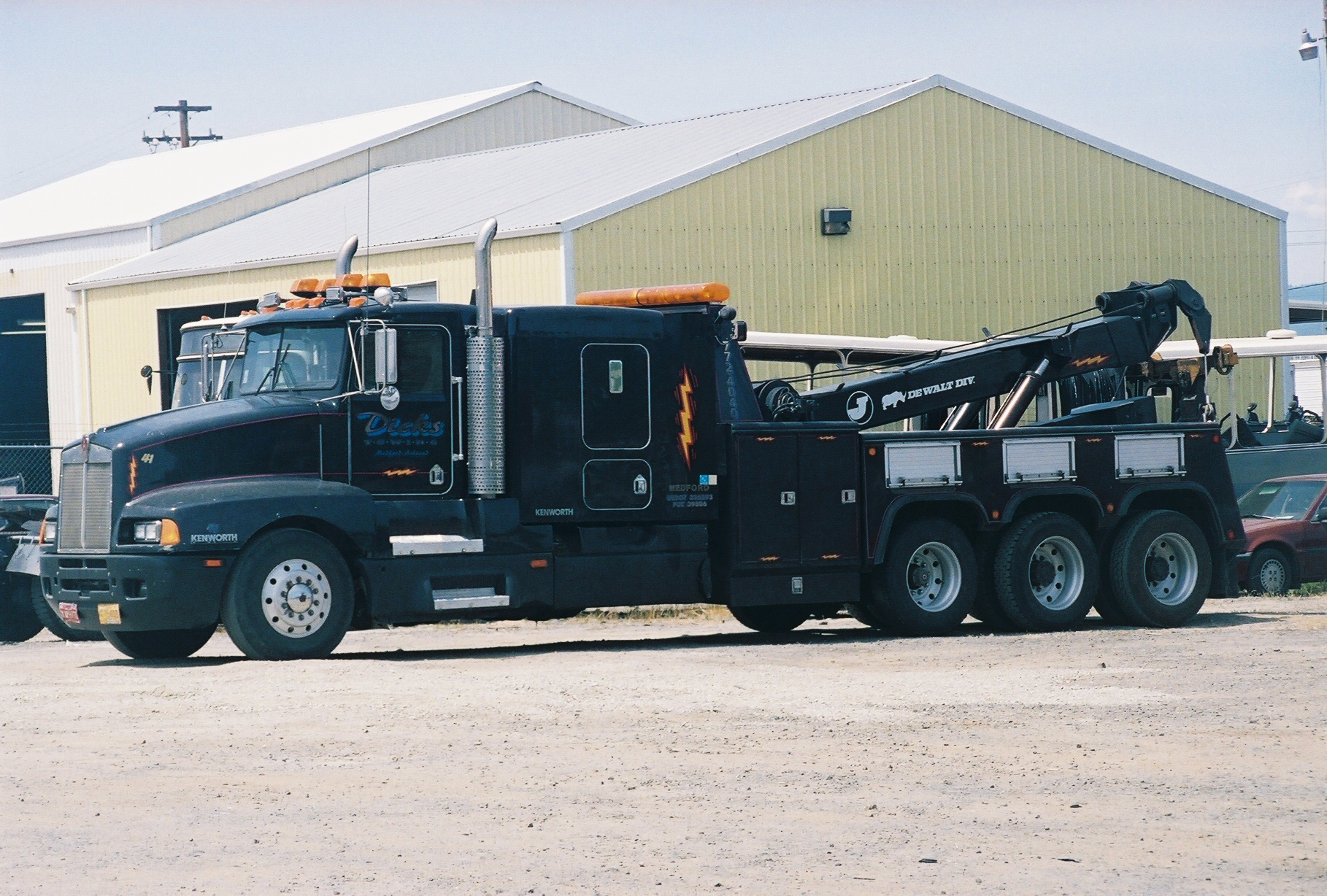
Heavy-duty sling type boom tow truck

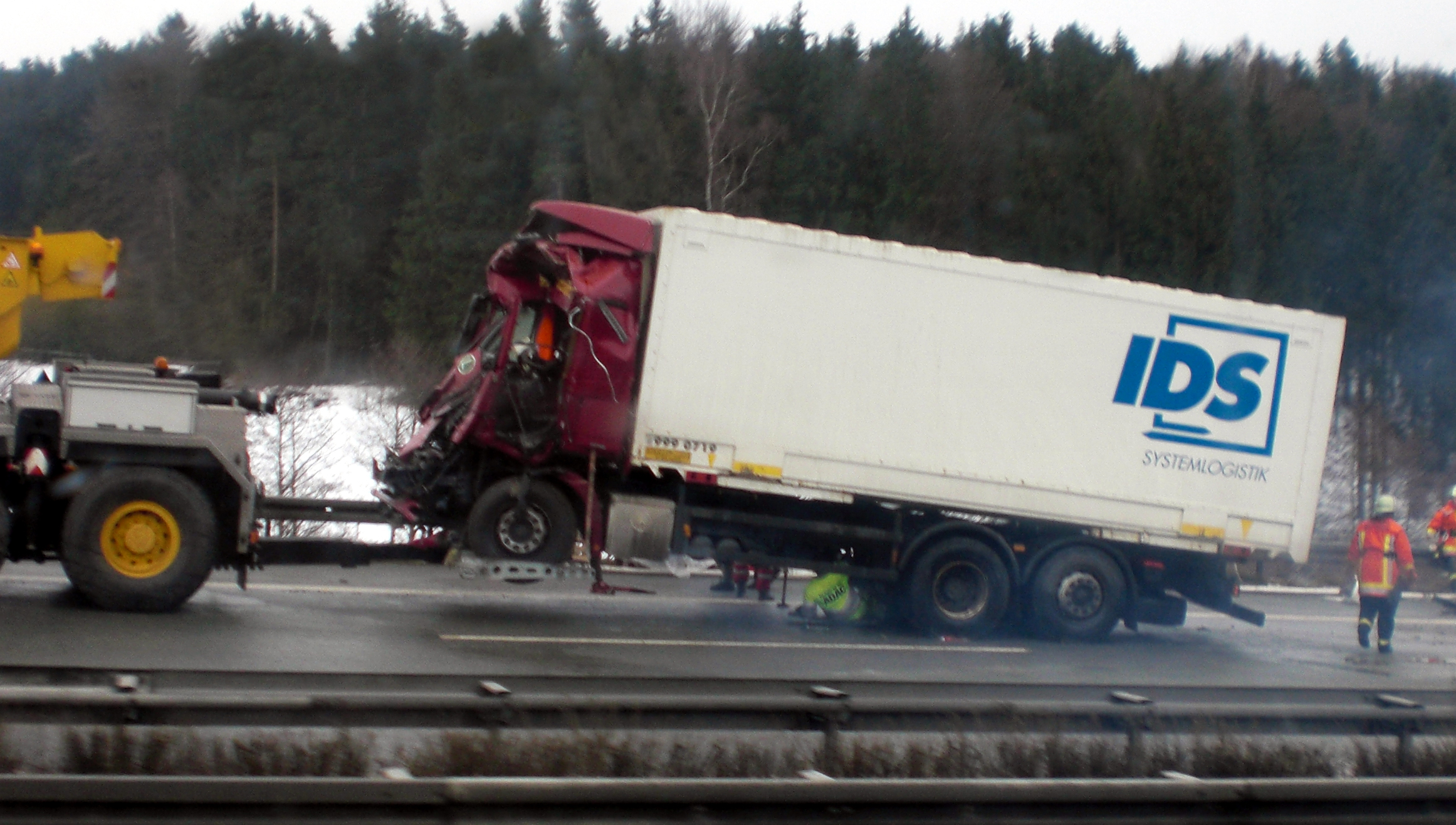
Towing a wrecked truck

Towing of cars and trucks is a unique form, with a job sector dedicated to it. Specialized "tow truck" vehicle types are most often used. Some of these are flatbed, with hydraulic tilting beds and winches and dollies to position the car behind the bed and pull it up onto the bed (flatbed towing). Others have a specialized boom hitch instead of a flatbed, which will lift one end of the car and allow it to ride on its remaining tires; they otherwise have similar equipment to the flatbeds and position and perform much like them (two-wheel dolly towing). In other cases, a specialized vehicle dolly can be attached to a standard vehicle hitch; for example, some moving vehicle rental companies, such as U-Haul, will rent these dollies for one-way transport of cars (flat tow bar towing).

Hitch tow trucks are mostly sized for cars and light-duty trucks. Larger versions, with a long, weighted body and heavier duty engines, transmissions, and tow hooks, may be used for towing of disabled buses, truck tractors, or large trucks. The artificial sizing and weighting must be designed to withstand the greater weight of the towed vehicle, which might otherwise tip the tow truck back.

When many cars are to be transported, rather than using a specialized vehicle, a specialized trailer may be used instead, attached to a standard tractor truck or other large vehicle. These сar carrier trailers (also known as auto hauling trailers) often bring cars from factories to dealers. They typically have two levels that each hold three to five cars, ramps for moving the cars from ground to either level, and hook/chain ties and mounts to secure the cars for transport. Their beds, on each level, may have channels or tracks to guide loading and further maintain transport stability.

Vehicle towing may be performed for the following reasons:

- Towing of disabled or damaged car at request of owner (the most common form)
- Towing of car by government authorities or its agents, due to being disabled or abandoned on a public thoroughfare
- Towing a car as a form of long-distance shipping, such as during its owner's move to a new location, rather than driving the car
- Repossession of a car by a lender
- As part of impoundment of vehicles by government agencies for infractions involving the vehicle in question, such as unpaid parking or moving violations ("tickets")

=== Dispatching ===
Requests for service are placed to a dispatching center. Some tow services communicate with drivers using Wireless telephone equipment. In others, the dispatching center contacts an available tow truck driver via mobile radio or by sending a text message using a mobile data terminal. Recent technology includes the use of GPS and on-board wireless equipment to dispatch drivers via an LCD screen receiver.

Some smaller towing companies, especially single-truck owner-operator outfits, may have only a single telephone and answering device for their "dispatch center". Increasingly, this will just be a mobile phone for the operator on duty, or may be the main telephone number for an associated mechanic, who will then send the truck from the shop or call the operator's mobile phone.

Dispatching networks exist for geographic automobile clubs, such as the British Royal Automobile Club, the American Automobile Association, and the Canadian Automobile Association. These organization primarily contract with many local tow truck operators (though they do have fleets of their own in some areas). The clubs will re-dispatch the requests from the club dispatch center to the local operators dispatch line, which, as above, may be a true dispatch center for larger tow fleets, or a simple business telephone line or mobile line for smaller operators. The club dispatch center will typically handle any follow-up needed on behalf of the customer, so that they do not need to track the multiple levels of dispatching.

=== Impounds and storage ===
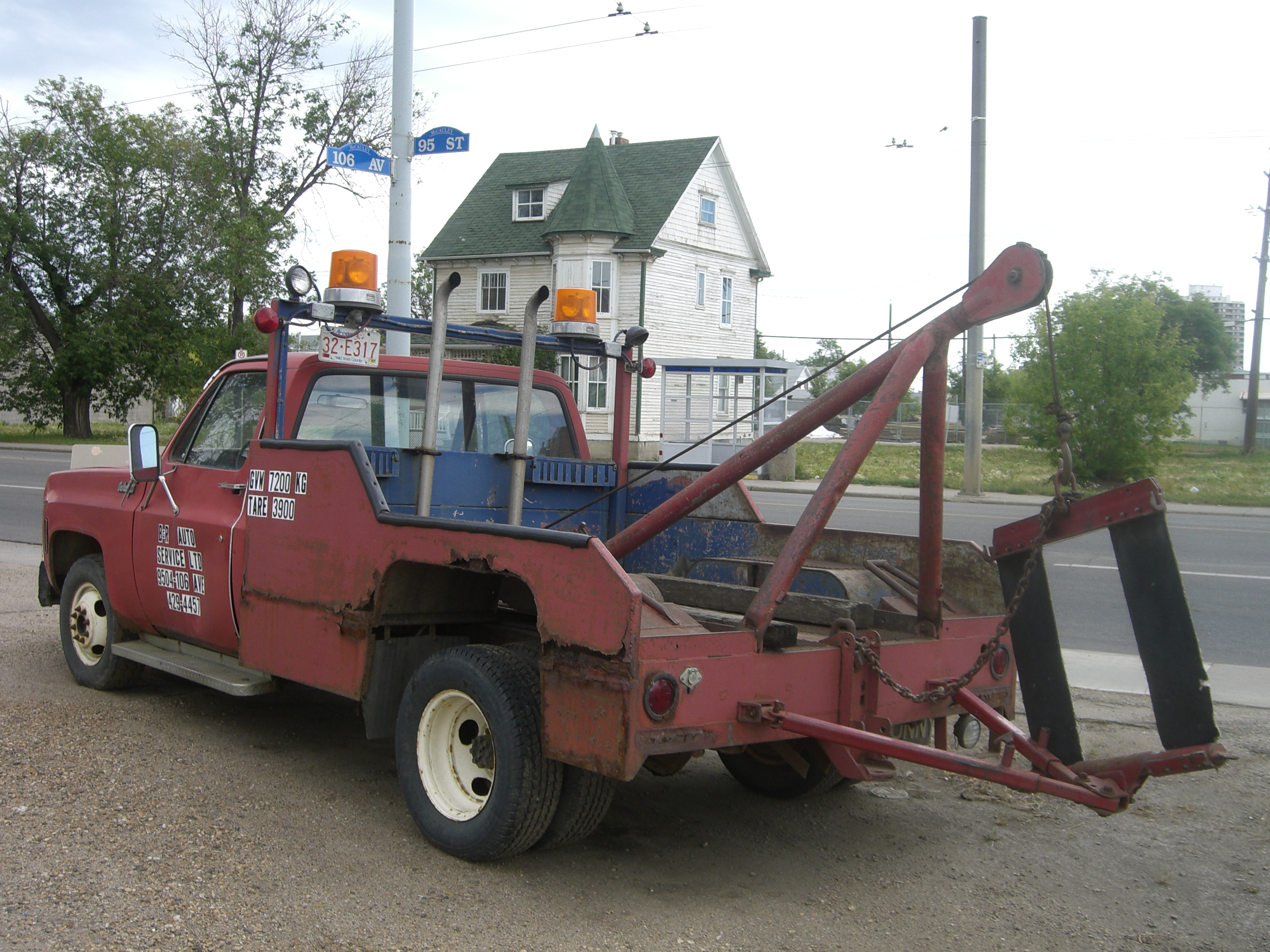
Older hook and chain type tow truck

Many tow companies can store vehicles that have been wrecked or impounded by police agencies. In these circumstances, police agencies notify a contracted towing provider to secure the vehicle and tow it to a storage lot. The tow company will sometimes prevent access to the vehicle until the law states the owner can claim it (usually after any fines are paid). Some local governments operate their own towing and impound lots, and do not need a contracted provider.

Nearly all tow companies charge a fee for storing vehicles.

=== GPS and AVL ===
Navigation systems are becoming more commonly used to tell the location (of stranded vehicles) to tow trucks. Automatic vehicle location (AVL) systems are sometimes used to help the dispatch center staff determine the closest tow truck. AVL may use GPS technology. It may display the location of all tow trucks on a map or may feed data directly to a computer-assisted dispatch system which automatically recommends the closest available units.

== Laws and regulations on the towing of vehicles ==
This section refers specifically to the laws of various countries regarding the towing of a car or truck by a specialty wrecker or tow truck.

The towing sector is known to have substantial potential for abuse, as towing most often occurs in difficult situations, with the person requiring towing having only a small number of towing companies to choose from. In addition, in certain situations, towing operators may initiate a towing procedure that is unwarranted, and the owner of the towed vehicle may be forced to make a payment to the operator before the vehicle is released. Various customer protection laws have been enacted by many jurisdictions to protect the public from predatory towing or predatory towing charges.

Other laws may govern training and licensing of tow truck operators and businesses, safety equipment, safe practices, and special permits for operating on certain roadways or in certain areas.

=== Towing law in the United States ===
In the United States, several states have laws that regulate the circumstances under which a car may be towed. Some of these laws are designed to prevent "predatory towing" whereby a legally parked vehicle is towed – or an illegally parked vehicle is towed by a towing operator unaffiliated with the parking facility (private or public) – to charge high fees from the car owner. Even when the predatory tow is stopped, if the vehicle is already hooked up to the tow truck in any fashion, the car is essentially disabled until the operator releases it, and the operator can therefore extort money from the towed car's owner.

Even where towing is performed legally, and even with the car owner's request for a tow, the towing company gains physical possession of the vehicle. The towing fees may be unexpectedly high in the absence of regulation.

In some jurisdictions, kidnapping laws may ban the towing of occupied vehicles. The majority of US states require additional mirrors for vehicles that tow something behind them. The requirements and regulations differ from state to state. In general, towing mirrors are an addition to the factory-installed vehicle mirrors, which allow seeing farther. The standard mirrors are designed to reflect what is behind the vehicle, and when a trailer is towed, they reflect the trailer. Larger mirrors with a greater viewing angle are required to see anything behind the trailer.

There are three main types of towing mirror:

- Permanently mounted mirrors. They screw into the fender or door of the vehicle and remain in place.
- Clip-on mirrors. They mount right on the OE mirror by means of a plastic housing, that completely envelopes the mirror that is on the vehicle.
- Extension mirrors. This type of mirror is mounted to the OE mirror with the help of a bar, which is clipped onto the edge of the plastic mirror housing.

==== Arizona ====
Some laws ensure the public receive ethical and fair business practices as in the private towing companies utilized by Arizona Department of Public Safety.

==== California ====
California law requires the tow company to immediately and unconditionally release a vehicle if the driver arrives prior to it being towed from the private property and in transit. The intent was to avoid the likelihood of dangerous and violent confrontation and physical injury to vehicle owners and towing operators, the stranding of vehicle owners and their passengers at a dangerous time and location, and impeding expedited vehicle recovery, without wasting law enforcement's limited resources.

==== Illinois ====
In October 2008, McHenry County, Illinois rescinded an earlier decision to put the Illinois Commerce Commission in charge of towing, in an effort to address "predatory towing".

==== Massachusetts ====
Massachusetts regulations sets the maximum towing charge for non-commercial vehicles at $108 in addition to $35 for every day the vehicle is held in storage. Vehicles may only be towed from private property with the vehicle owner's permission or if the property owner provides in writing to the local police the address to which the vehicle will be towed.

==== Maryland ====
Maryland towing sector representatives testified to a state task force in October 2008 that nearly all complaints are the fault of "gypsy towers" and "snatch-and-grabbers".

==== New Jersey ====
Some limited-access highways, especially the Garden State Parkway and the New Jersey Turnpike, require specially designated towing businesses to be the only tow operators on them. This is to allow for better traffic flow and safety, as not all tow operators are familiar with the roads, access points and turnaround points, road construction quirks, and methods to quickly and safely remove disabled cars from the roadway. There is also the concern of arrival delay; the roadway authorities wish to avoid out-of-area tow companies, as the delay for arriving from distant locations increases the length of traffic delays in time and distance.

==== Oregon ====
Oregon law requires that the tower release a vehicle at no charge only if the driver is present prior to the hookup being complete. The tower must also take at least one photograph of the vehicle and record the time and date of the photograph. The photograph must show the vehicle violation which prompted the tow.

==== Virginia ====
Virginia and its municipalities have enacted anti-"predatory towing" legislation. Some features of the legislation include the requirement to post warning signs at all entrances, setting maximum fees for towing and storage, and requiring photographs to be taken before towing to show the condition of the vehicle as well as the lawfulness of the towing.

=== Towing law in Australia ===
All Australian States have laws which regulate towing companies, particularly those which engage in towing light and heavy vehicles involved in road accidents.

==== Queensland ====
The Tow Truck Regulation 2009 is the legislation in State of Queensland which governs accident towing in regulated areas of the state. It includes economic governance, occupational safety and general customer protection.

In April 2013, the Queensland Government approved amendments to the Police Powers and Responsibilities Act 2000, regarding motor vehicle impoundment with the aim of improving road safety.

On November 1, 2013, State of Queensland the amended legislation commenced as the countries toughest anti-hooning laws.

From May 1, 2014, Australian towing company Tow.com.au was contracted by the Queensland Police Service as the exclusive provider of towing and impoundment relating to hoon type 1 and type 2 offences in the State of Queensland.

==== Victoria ====
The Accident Towing Services Act is the prime statute for towing companies in the State of Victoria. It includes economic governance, occupational safety and general customer protection. First, the statute restricts the number of accident towing vehicles across the State and also contains a scheme regulating the orderly allocation of tow trucks to road accident sites. Second, the act sets minimum standards on the character of towing company employers and also regulates the behaviour of participants once they enter the field.

The framework of offences in the act broadly seeks to give practical effect to the "chain of responsibility" concept in the accident towing sector. The concept seeks to identify the sector parties who are in a sufficient position of control over risks, in this case potentially unsafe and unethical conduct following road accidents, and to allocate responsibility through law accordingly to deter and punish those behaviours.

The behavioural controls in the Act cover a wide range of activities and practices including the allocation of tow trucks to accident sites in "controlled areas" and conduct at road accident sites and during post accident repair work. The scheme was broadly prompted by customer protection sentiment, in particular, the recognition of the vulnerability of road accident victims. Care was evident during development of the scheme to maintain and enhance existing character standards in the sector due to past behavioural issues in Victoria including the infiltration of criminal elements into some areas and conflict at accident scenes.

In broad terms, the Accident Towing Services Act regulates accident towing companies in Victoria by:

- establishing a licensing scheme for the tow trucks which provide accident towing services
- requiring the accreditation of operators of accident towing service businesses and managers of the depots from which accident tow trucks operate
- requiring the accreditation of accident tow truck drivers
- establishing requirements and protections relating to the storage and repair of motor vehicles following road accidents.

== Aircraft ==
Gliders are towed into the air by powered aircraft. Target tugs are towed in the air for military target practice.

On the ground, aircraft can be towed into position by pushback tractors or tugs.

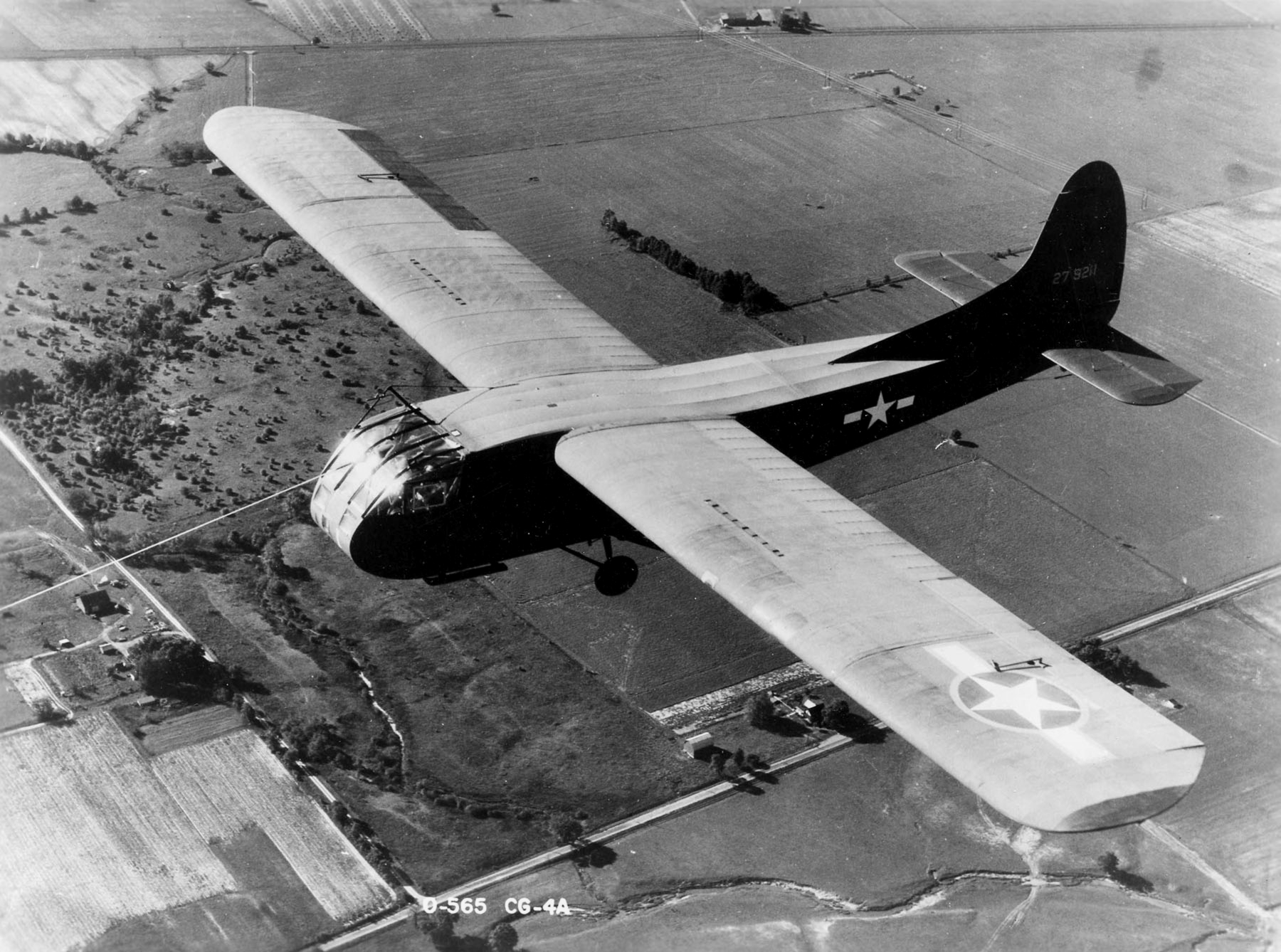
A military glider being pulled aloft

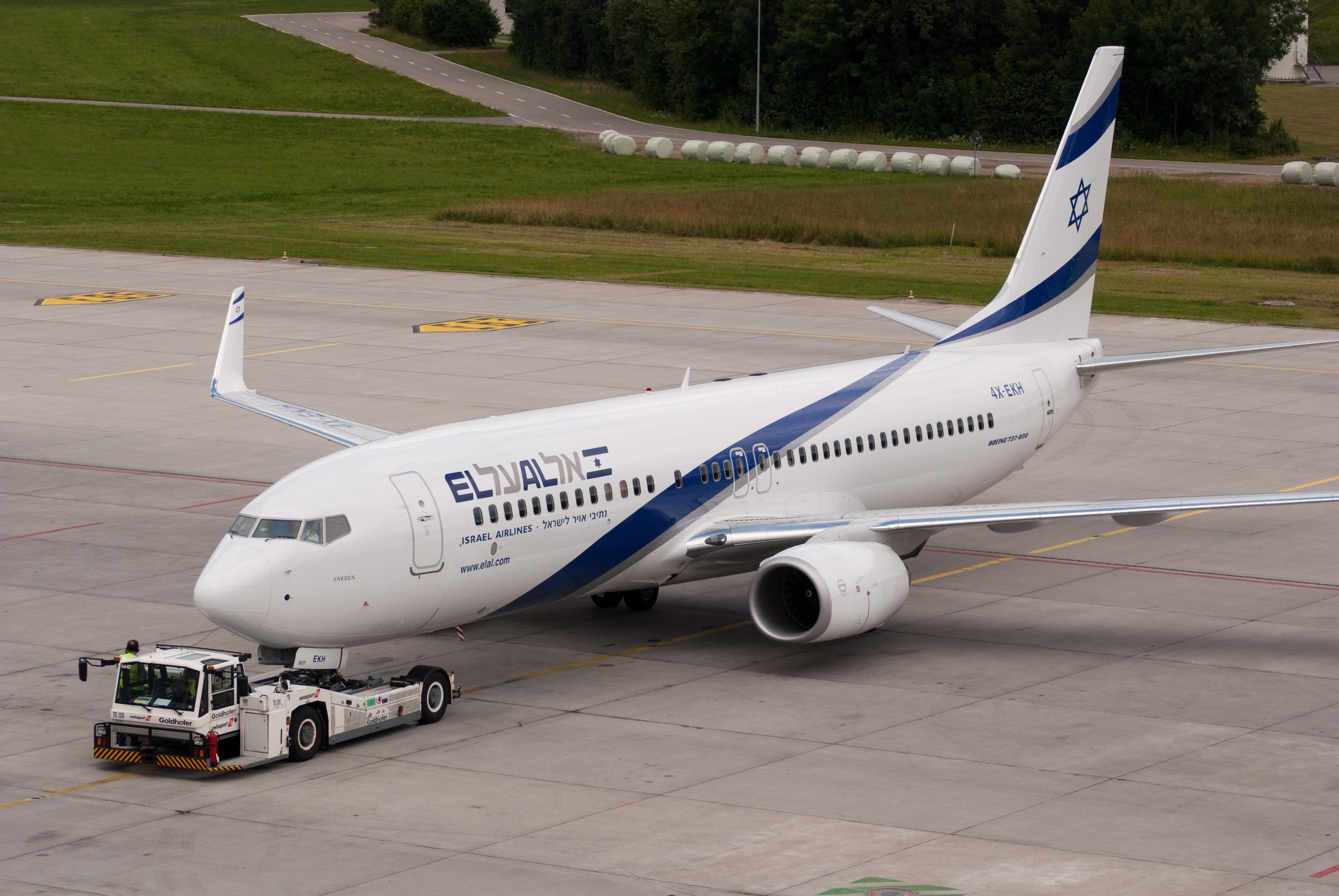
An aircraft being towed at Zürich Airport

== Ships ==
Before steamships, one way of moving boats along rivers and canals was having them towed by people such as burlaks or animals. Towpaths were built to make this easier. Tugboats are used to position large ships in harbors or to move disabled ones.

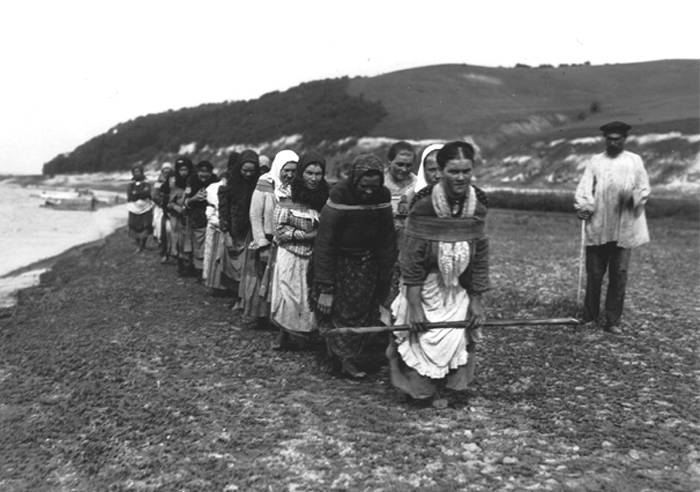
Burlaks towing a boat

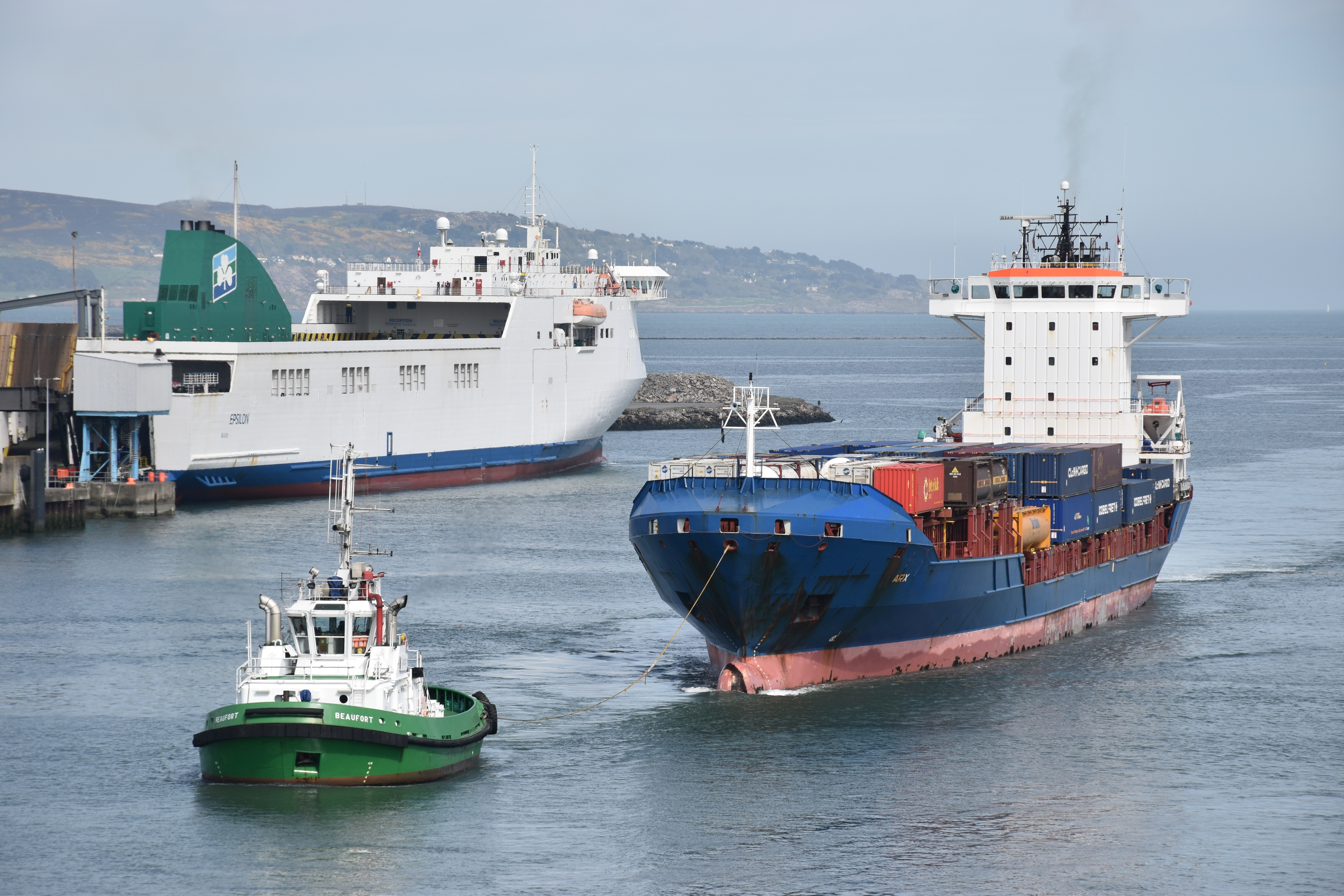
A tugboat in operation

== See also ==
- South Beach Tow, a TV reality show about two tow real companies story (the program is fictionalized)
- Vehicle recovery
- Tow hitch
- Roll trailer
