= Impoundment =

Impoundment may refer to:

== Water control ==
- The result of a dam, creating a body of water
  - A reservoir, formed by a dam
  - Coal slurry impoundment, a specialized form of such a reservoir used for coal mining and processing
- Impounded dock, an enclosed ship dock that uses locks to impound water to a consistent depth within the dock area
- Impoundment rights, a German system of permits and taxes for damming rivers

== Other uses ==
- Impoundment of appropriated funds, the decision of a President of the United States not to spend money appropriated by Congress
- Vehicle impoundment

== See also ==
- Pound (disambiguation)
- Seize (disambiguation)
