= Seized =

Seized may refer to:

- Seisin, a legal concept
- Seized (2020 film), an American action thriller film
- Seized (2026 film), an upcoming American documentary film

== See also ==
- Seize (disambiguation)
