= Vehicle impoundment =

Legal process of restricting access to a vehicle for a period of time

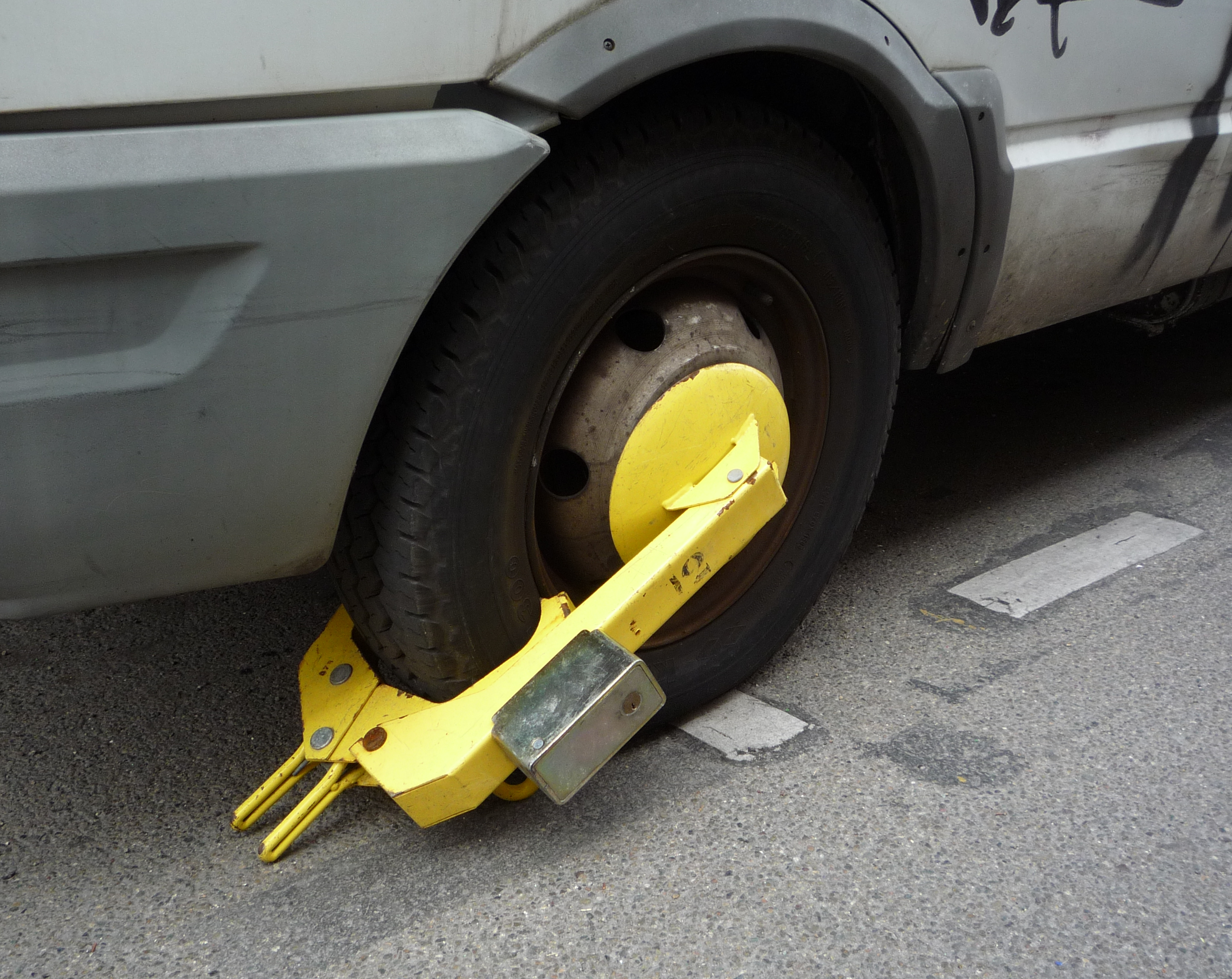
Vehicle immobilization is a key part of impounding.

Vehicle impoundment is the legal process of storing a vehicle in an impoundment lot or tow yard until it is returned to the owner, recycled, stripped for parts at a wrecking yard, or auctioned off by the impounding agency.

== Etymology ==
An impoundment lot, commonly referred to as a "vehicle pound", is a secured area where vehicles are held. The term impound means to place something in a pound, such as a vehicle or other items. This term is often used specifically for vehicle impoundment lots, distinguishing them from other types of pounds like dog pounds.

== Process of vehicle impoundment ==
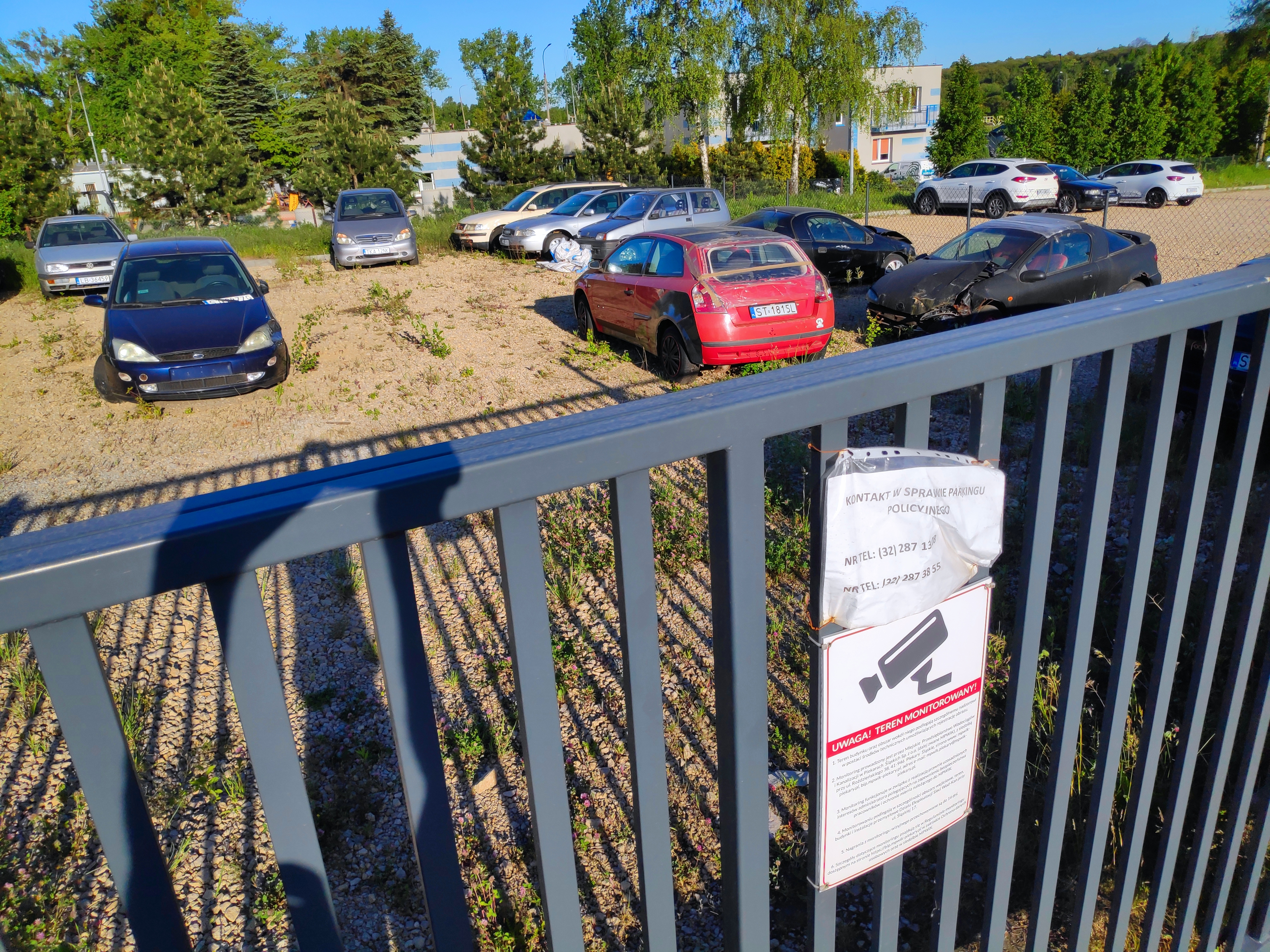
Police parking with impounded vehicles in Poland.

Vehicles may be impounded for the following reasons:

- by government agencies (usually municipalities) when
  - there are unresolved parking violation(s) of a certain age and possibly above a total fine threshold
  - in certain instances, during the violation of a parking ordinance (in zones marked "tow away zone" or similar)
  - the registrant of the vehicle has certain unresolved moving violations
  - the vehicle is collected as evidence of the commission of a potential crime (e.g. homicide or drug smuggling).
  - there are no qualified drivers to operate the vehicle
- in some jurisdictions, as part of repossession of a vehicle by a lessor or lender

The process for impoundment is as follows:

- Owner or operator creates the legal basis for impoundment as above (failure to make payment, illegal use of vehicles, etc.)
- A grant of authority to impound is made either implicitly or explicitly (see below)
- An agency that has the legally authorized to execute impoundment locates the vehicle (see below)
- The agency takes possession of the vehicle and tows it to the impoundment lot
- If the owner or operator does not clear the issue (payment, etc.), after a certain defined time, the vehicle is sold at auction
- After the costs of the auction, the auction process and other fees have been deducted from the sale price, the remainder is returned to the owner

=== Grant of authority ===
Before a vehicle can be impounded, the impounding agency must have the legal authority to do so. This authority may be granted through a court decision or automatically under certain conditions. For example, in New York City, a vehicle with an unpaid parking ticket that has not been addressed within 100 days may be subject to impoundment by the New York City Sheriff.

In repossession-based impoundment, the lending agency or its assignee is authorized by a court order or contract law to repossess the vehicle. The lender may use its own resources in some jurisdictions, while in others, a government agent like a sheriff or marshall must be involved in the repossession process.

=== Locating the vehicle ===
An impounding agency may target specific vehicles for impoundment, such as those involved in repossession, with large fines, or serious violations. Agents are sent to check vehicles in a designated area against a list of impound candidates. If a vehicle on the list is found, the agent initiates the process of taking possession and towing the vehicle.

=== Towing the vehicle ===
The impounding agent may use a tow truck to conduct the tow directly. If the agent lacks authority, they may need to call in a badged agent or marshal to oversee the operation. If the agent does not have a tow vehicle, they must request one from the agency's fleet or a contracted towing company.

In some cases, the owner or operator can stop a tow by paying the fine on the spot using a portable credit card reader.

The towed vehicle is brought to an impoundment lot, which may be dedicated solely to impounded vehicles or serve other purposes such as parking or vehicle repair.

== Auction ==
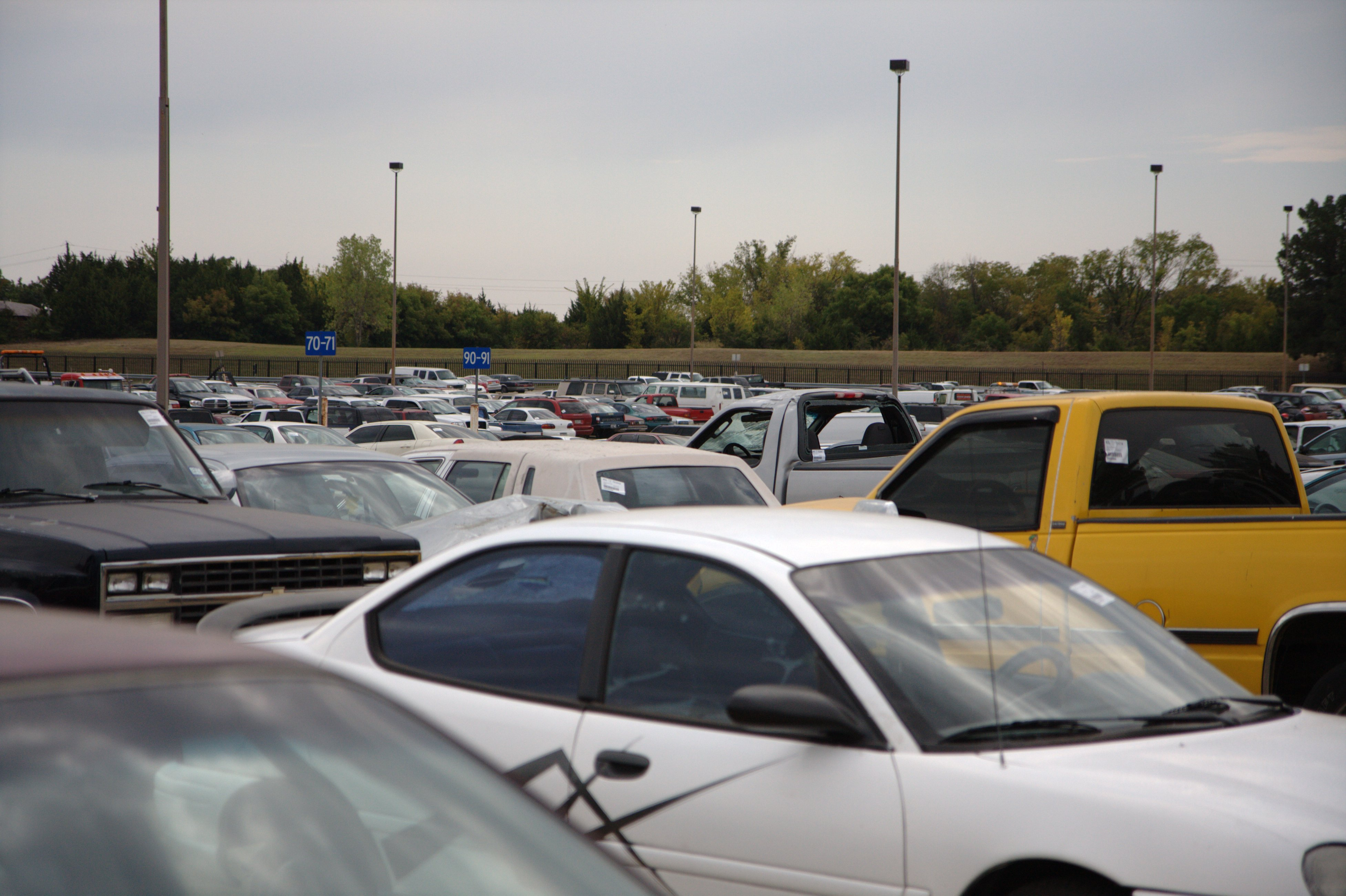
Impoundment lot in the United States.

An impounded vehicle auction is a specialized auction where abandoned and disabled vehicles are sold to recover towing and storage costs. These vehicles are typically towed by municipalities or private companies and auctioned off after a certain period of time has passed.

Tow lot auctions are usually conducted by an auctioneer on-site, but online auctions are becoming increasingly popular.

Before a vehicle can be auctioned, most states require a thorough process to determine the owner and title disposition. This process typically involves a title search, publication of the impending sale, and sending certified letters to the owner to give them a chance to pay towing and storage fees and reclaim the vehicle. For vehicles in good condition, the towing company may provide possessory lien papers, which can be used to obtain a new title. Due to the costs involved, auction lots often charge a substantial fee for these papers.

Impound auctions regulations vary by state and municipality. In Missouri, impounded vehicles can only be sold to the general public with a salvage title. Some states require bidders to register as salvage dealers or restoration companies, while others have no restrictions on buyers.

Impounded vehicles are sold as-is, where-is without warranty at auctions. The auctioneers may have limited knowledge of the vehicle's mechanical condition and are not obligated to provide warranties. Winning bidders must purchase and take possession of the vehicle, even if it cannot be driven off the lot. Keys may not be available, and the mileage of cars with digital dashboards may be unknown.

== Local laws ==
=== Australia ===
==== Queensland ====
In April 2013, the Queensland Government amended the Police Powers and Responsibilities Act 2000 to enhance road safety by implementing changes to motor vehicle impoundment regulations.

On November 1, 2013, Queensland implemented amended legislation, introducing some of the country's strictest anti-hooning laws.

Since May 1, 2014, the Australian towing company Tow.com.au has been the exclusive provider of towing and impoundment services for hoon type 1 and type 2 offenses in the Queensland under contract with the Queensland Police Service.

=== Canada ===
==== Ontario ====
Vehicle impoundment is mandatory for certain offences, such as exceeding the speed limit by at least 50 km/h and drunk-driving.

=== United States ===
==== North Carolina ====
Under North Carolina state law, a vehicle impounded by law enforcement can be sold at auction if towing and storage costs exceed a certain threshold, regardless of the owner's involvement in the incident. Additionally, following a defendant's trial, a judge has the authority to forfeit the vehicle to a school board.

==== California ====
In 2015, Sacramento proposed legislation to protect homeless individuals from having their belongings impounded for profit. The law aimed to prevent the practice of seizing homeless people's possessions, often their only shelter, and selling them for a $50 profit at impound lots.

==== Washington ====
In Seattle, impound fees in three different towing classes range from $165 to $209 per hour.

== See also ==
- Tow truck
- Impoundment
- Towing racket
