= Seize =

Seize or seise may refer to:

- Seisin, legal possession of property
- Seizing, a class of knots used to semi-permanently bind together two ropes
- Seize (band), a British electronic band
- The jamming of machine parts against each other, usually due to insufficient lubrication
- Seize, a fictional town the anime TV series Sound of the Sky

== See also ==
- Confiscation
- Detain
- Impoundment (disambiguation)
- Raptus
- Seizure (disambiguation)
- Sequester (disambiguation)
- Usurper
