= UN Recommendations on the Transport of Dangerous Goods =

United Nations Model Regulations

The UN Recommendations on the Transport of Dangerous Goods are contained in the UN Model Regulations prepared by the Subcommittee of Experts on the Transport of Dangerous Goods of the United Nations Economic and Social Council (ECOSOC). They cover the transport of dangerous goods by all modes of transport except by bulk tanker. They are not obligatory or legally binding on individual countries, but have gained a wide degree of international acceptance: they form the basis of several international agreements and many national laws.

"Dangerous goods" (also known as "hazardous materials" or "HAZMAT" in the United States) may be a pure chemical substance (e.g. TNT, nitroglycerin), mixtures (e.g. dynamite, gunpowder) or manufactured articles (e.g. ammunition, fireworks). The transport hazards that they pose are grouped into nine classes, which may be subdivided into divisions and/or packing groups. The most common dangerous goods are assigned a UN number, a four digit code which identifies it internationally. Less common substances are transported under generic codes such as "UN1993: flammable liquid, not otherwise specified".

The UN Recommendations do not cover the manufacturing, use or disposal of dangerous goods.

== History and principles ==
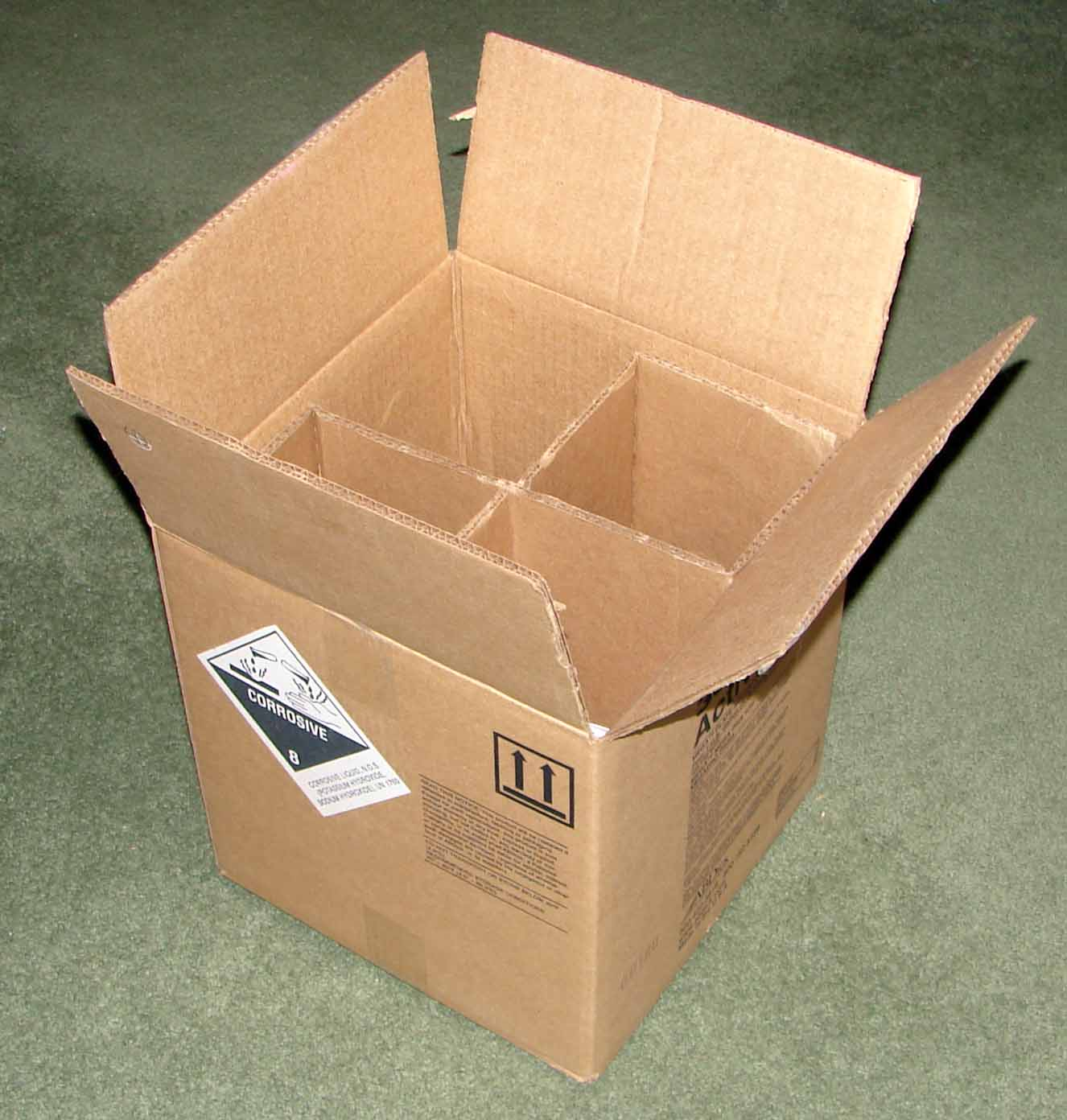
A UN 4G Doublewall corrugated fiberboard box with dividers for shipping four bottles of corrosive liquid, certified to the Packing Group III performance level

The first version of the Recommendations on the Transport of Dangerous Goods was produced by the ECOSOC in 1956. From 1996, the Recommendations were effectively split into two parts: the Model Regulations, which form a suggested drafting for laws and regulations on the transport of dangerous goods; and the Manual of Tests and Criteria, which contains technical information about methods of testing products to ascertain their hazards. The 23rd edition of the Recommendations was published in the year 2023.

The container requirements include some material and construction requirements but also performance testing is required. The package testing is based on the packing group (hazard level) of the contents, the quantity of material, and the type of container.

The UN recommendations are implemented by regulatory bodies in each country: Transport Canada, United States Department of Transportation, etc. Some carriers have additional requirements.

== See also ==
- Globally Harmonized System of Classification and Labelling of Chemicals (GHS)
- Australian Dangerous Goods Code
- European Agreement concerning the International Carriage of Dangerous Goods by Road (ADR) – On transport of hazardous materials
- International Maritime Dangerous Goods Code (IMDG Code) – Maritime Safety Committee guideline on shipment, (part of the International Convention for the Safety of Life at Sea)
- Annex 18 of the Convention on International Civil Aviation – 1944 treaty establishing rules of air travel ("Safe Transport of Dangerous Goods by Air")
- International Air Transport Association – International trade association for airlines
- Lists of UN numbers
