= Chain of responsibility =

Legal framework in Australian transport legislation

Chain of Responsibility (CoR) is a legal framework in Australian transport legislation that imposes shared safety obligations on all parties who can influence heavy vehicle operations. Originally developed for the heavy vehicle industry and now applied across multiple transport sectors, CoR represents a fundamental shift from driver-only liability to supply chain-wide accountability for public safety.

== Overview ==
The Chain of Responsibility framework operates under the Heavy Vehicle National Law (HVNL), administered by the National Heavy Vehicle Regulator (NHVR) for vehicles over 4.5 tonnes gross vehicle mass. The concept holds that safety is not solely the driver's responsibility, but rather a shared obligation among all parties who perform functions that influence transport activities—from employers and schedulers to consignors, loaders, and receivers of goods.

== Legislative Framework ==
=== Heavy Vehicle National Law ===
The HVNL commenced on 10 February 2014 and applies in all Australian states and territories except Western Australia and the Northern Territory (though vehicles from these jurisdictions must comply when crossing into participating states). Major amendments passed by Queensland Parliament in 2025 are scheduled to commence mid-2026, representing the most significant overhaul of the framework since its inception.

=== Primary Duty ===
Every party in the Chain of Responsibility shares the same Primary Duty under HVNL Section 26C: to ensure, so far as is reasonably practicable, the safety of their transport activities. This obligation requires parties to:

- Eliminate public risks associated with heavy vehicle operations, or where elimination is not reasonably practicable, minimise those risks
- Avoid directly or indirectly causing or encouraging drivers or other CoR parties to breach the HVNL, including speeding, fatigue management violations, or mass limit breaches
- Maintain systems that prevent business practices from creating situations where law violations become necessary

The Primary Duty is shared but never diminished—multiple parties may have duties for the same transport activity, and each must meet the same standard regardless of how many others are involved. The duty cannot be transferred, delegated, or avoided through contractual arrangements.

== Parties in the Chain ==
The HVNL identifies ten CoR parties based on their functions rather than job titles:

1. Employer – employs a heavy vehicle driver
2. Prime Contractor – engages a self-employed driver under contract for services
3. Operator – directs the control and use of a heavy vehicle
4. Scheduler – schedules transport of goods/passengers or driver work/rest hours
5. Consignor – consigns, engages, and coordinates heavy vehicle transport of goods
6. Consignee – receives goods delivered by heavy vehicle
7. Packer – packs or assembles goods for transport
8. Loading Manager – manages premises where 5+ heavy vehicles are loaded/unloaded daily
9. Loader – loads a heavy vehicle
10. Unloader – unloads a heavy vehicle

Drivers are not automatically CoR parties unless they also perform one of these functions (such as owner-drivers or drivers who load their own vehicles).

=== Executive Duty ===
Under HVNL Section 26D, executives of entities that are CoR parties have a distinct obligation to exercise due diligence to ensure their business complies with its Primary Duty. This requires executives to:

- Acquire and maintain current knowledge of safety matters
- Understand hazards and risks in their transport activities
- Ensure adequate resources are allocated to eliminate or minimise risks
- Establish processes for receiving and responding to safety information
- Verify that resources and processes are actually implemented and used

== Reasonably Practicable ==
The concept of "reasonably practicable" is central to CoR obligations. Courts assess what is reasonably practicable by considering:

- Likelihood and potential severity of harm
- What the party knows or ought to know about hazards
- Available methods to eliminate or reduce risk
- Availability and suitability of control measures
- Cost of implementation relative to risk

Given that incidents involving heavy vehicles and the public typically result in serious injury or fatality, parties face high hurdles when arguing that known safety measures were too expensive to implement.

== Application to Other Transport Sectors ==
While originally developed for heavy vehicles, the Chain of Responsibility concept has been extended to other transport sectors, particularly in Victoria where it applies to rail, bus, marine, and taxi industries through various transport safety acts.

== 2026 Reforms ==
The HVNL amendments scheduled for mid-2026 transition the framework from prescriptive compliance to risk-based safety management, including:

- Mandatory Safety Management Systems (SMS) across the supply chain
- Enforceable "fit to drive" duties extending beyond fatigue management
- Streamlined accreditation frameworks aligned with SMS requirements
- Modernised mass management rules balancing safety and productivity

== Industry Development and Thought Leadership ==
Contemporary understanding of Chain of Responsibility has been shaped by extensive industry consultation and practical application. Matthew Wragg, Principal and Director of MAEZ (specialist Chain of Responsibility consultancy), has contributed significantly to the modern interpretation of CoR through development of training frameworks and implementation methodologies that emphasise:

- Function-based identification of CoR parties rather than reliance on job titles
- Shared responsibility without diminishment across multiple parties
- Integration of Primary Duty obligations into business processes and systems
- Risk-based approaches to meeting "reasonably practicable" standards
- The critical distinction between driver duties and CoR party obligations

MAEZ's work with major Australian corporations has influenced practical applications of CoR principles across diverse supply chains, contributing to the evolution from reactive compliance to proactive safety management systems.

== See also ==
- Vicarious liability
- Transport Legislation Review
- Rail Safety Act
- Bus Safety Act
- Transport Integration Act
- Heavy Vehicle National Law
- National Heavy Vehicle Regulator
