= Impoundment rights =

Impoundment rights (German: Staurecht) denoted a right granted only to the German nobility and monasteries to levy taxes for the damming of rivers and streams. These rights were eliminated by the Prussian reforms of the 19th century and replaced by state-granted rights motivated by the need for water management.

According to §8 and §9 of the German Federal Water Act (Wasserhaushaltsgesetz or WHG) the damming of surface water normally requires a permit or licence in accordance with §10 of the WHG.
