= ANSI Z35 =

American technical standard for safety signs

ANSI Z35.1
- Specifications for Accident Prevention Signs
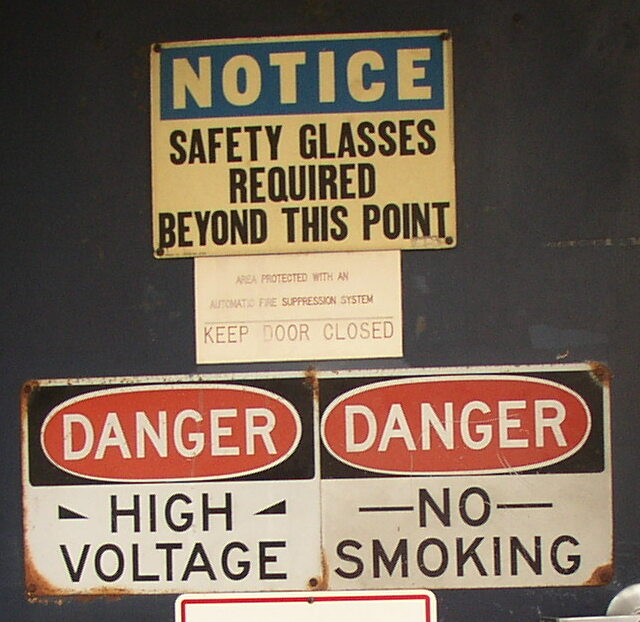
- Photograph of three Z35.1 signs, a "Notice" and two "Danger" signs.
- Abbreviation: ANSI Z35.1, ASA Z35.1, Z35.1
- Year started: 1937
- First published: January 10, 1941; 85 years ago
- Latest version: 4; 1972
- Organization: American National Standards Institute Originally known as "American Standards Association"
- Committee: Committee Z35
- Series: Z35
- Related standards: ANSI Z53 (Note: Standard for Safety Color Code for Marking Physical Hazards and Equipment.); Building Exits Code (Note: Now known as NFPA 101 - Life Safety Code); Successor standard: ANSI Z535
- Domain: Safety signage design

ANSI Z35.1 the Specifications for Accident Prevention Signs, (Note: The title changed twice. This is the final name, used with the fourth, 1972 edition.) was an American standard that dictated the layout, colors and wording of safety signs in the United States. The standard is the first American standard that made specific demands for the design, construction, and placement of safety signage in industrial environments. The first edition was published in January 1941, and the fourth and final edition in November 1972. (Note: A supplemental document for 'informational signs' was published in 1973. It was not intended as a stand alone edition.) Changes in societal needs of signage, and further research into signage would result in the establishment of a new committee, the ANSI Z535 Committee on Safety Signs and Colors, combining the separate committees of Z35.1 - Specifications for Accident Prevention Signs, Z35.2 - Specifications for Accident Prevention Tags, and Z53 - Marking Physical Hazards Safety Color Code, resulting in a new combined standard, ANSI Z535.

== Background ==
Diagram of Stonehouse's 1912 'Universal Danger Signal' design.

Initial groundwork for safety signs started in the 1910s, with Hansen's Universal Safety Standards (1913) called for a "universal danger sign" consisting of the word "DANGER" in white letters on a red field, and a "universal safety sign" consisting of white letters on a green field, for identifying exits and first aid equipment. Beyond this, various industries, including railroads, mines, and woodworking designed and implemented their own signage to protect workers and the public.

In 1912 James W Stonehouse, a sign manufacturer in Colorado would advertise an early form of the iconic 'DANGER' sign, referred to as the 'universal danger signal'. It featured a red oval, on a black rectangle, with 'DANGER' in white letters. He would later devise and sell multiple uniform safety sign designs. Revised versions of these early designs would later become the basis of Z35.1.

In 1937, the National Safety Council identifying the need to improve workplace and industrial safety by setting standardized sign designs, to replace the haphazard sign designs that every workplace and industry was coming up with independently with set designs that workers could recognize in any workplace, on any jobsite in any industry. The NSC approached the American standards Association with the proposal, sponsored and led the project.

Design, application and use of warning signs or symbols (other than slogans) intended to indicate, and in so far as possible, to define specific hazard of a nature such that failure to so designate them may cause, or tend to cause, accidental injury to workers, or the public, or both

— ASA Z35.1 Project Scope, Specifications for Industrial Accident Prevention Signs (1941)

Even as early as the first edition, safety signs were recommended as a solution for when eliminating the hazard could not be achieved. Elimination or guarding against a hazard was a superior form of protection. While Z35.1 was intended for widespread use across all industries, there were exceptions. Z35.1 signage was not intended for motor vehicles, trains, maritime traffic, all of had specific regulations and standards of their own, such as the Manual on Uniform Traffic Control Devices for motor vehicles. Also excluded were safety posters, safety slogans, and bulletin boards, while safety related, fell out of the project scope, and were for clarity explicitly excluded.

== Design ==
Diagram of a Z35.1 sign - A. Signal Word, B. Header, C. Text message.

Z35.1 consisted of a common design through its four editions, consisting of three primary elements.

- Header panel - The top portion of the sign, consisting of a colored rectangle, containing the signal word.
- Signal word - A single word or phrase intended indicate sign purpose.
- Text message - The text conveying the hazard or other information.

Headers were always placed on top, with the text message located below the header. The design of headers, including distinct designs, such as the oval of 'Danger' and the solid black block of 'Caution' was intentional. This enabled non-English speaking persons to associate a design with hazard severity, and enabled color blind individuals to differentiate between header designs. Headers were not required on informational, directional and fire/emergency signs. How to include symbols on a sign was not elaborated on until the fourth, 1972 edition, with the exception of the Radiation sign.

== Editions ==
=== 1941 ===
The first edition, published on 10 January 1941, the designs laid out in this edition would be the foundation for all successive versions.

Consideration was made for other forms of warning, such as tags, flags, and flare pots, (Note: A common signal device at the time, similar to a modern road flare. It was a metal ball containing a liquid fuel source with burning wick on top, and was designed to be reused. They were replaced by electric warning lights and disposable roadway flares.) but were set aside in order to complete the standard as quickly as possible.

Danger

Caution

Safety Instruction

Informational

Informational
(Alternate Design)

Directional

=== 1959 ===
Z35.1-1959 was the second edition of the standard, published in 1959. This would mark the first appearance of the ionizing radiation trefoil symbol in the Z35.1 standard, as well as the addition of a radiation warning sign design.

Radiation

Radiation trefoil symbol

=== 1968 ===
The third edition, published 18 September 1968, would see the addition of the slow moving vehicle emblem, and the Biological hazard symbol. The symbol developed two years earlier by staff at Dow Chemical Company as a standardized symbol to warn of infectious substances, which it was adopted for this purpose by Z35 Committee through its inclusion in Z35.1.

Slow Moving Vehicle

Biological Hazard

==== OSHA adoption ====
In 1971, OSHA adopted regulation §1910.145, which required that accident prevention signs in workplaces to comply with the standards laid out in ANSI Z35.1-1968 and ANSI Z35.2-1968 (Note: Accident Prevention Tags) starting on August 31, 1971. Later, in 1979, OSHA would adopt regulation §1926.200 which specified accident prevention signs for use in the construction industry. The regulation varied a bit from §1910.145, by requiring a specific design for exit signs, using red 6 inches (150 mm) letters on a white background, omitting mention of radiation and biohazard signs, tags, and symbols; as well as informational or 'Notice' signage and the slow moving vehicle emblem. However, it did state that signs and tags were required to comply with Z35.1-1968 and Z35.2-1968 in situations not covered by the rules in regulation.

=== 1972 ===
The fourth and final edition of Z35, published on 16 November 1972 would see significant change in the standard, with it being nearly half the page count, and would a split of the standard, spinning off "informational and miscellaneous signs" and "directional signs" as a supplemental standard, later released as Z35.3-1973. Z35.1 would be overhauled, doing away with the suggested wordings, diagrams of the headers, charts of various sign dimensions. Signs were reorganized into a new 'Class' system, which assigned each type a class number. (Note: Class I: Danger; Class II: Caution; Class III: General Safety; Class IV: Fire & Emergency; Class V: Radiation.) Guidance in the standard was made more general, leaving decisions to sign manufactures and workplaces. Clearer guidance on how to include a symbol with a sign's design was provided, however symbols, aside from five specific ones, (Note: 1. Radiation trifoil; 2. Radio-frequency hazard symbol, 3. Slow Moving Vehicle symbol, 4. Fissile material symbol, 5. A laser symbol that was in development at the time.) were not provided, nor guidance on where to obtain or how to design symbols. A new 'Fire/Emergency' sign was designed, and references to exit signage were removed, instructing readers to refer to NFPA standards.

Split off from Z35.1, informational signs became the new Z35.3 Specifications for Informational Signs Complimentary to ANSI Z35.1-1972, Accident Prevention Signs standard. This standard also used the class system, with two classes: Class A, informational and Class B, Regulatory, which was new to the Z35 standard. The default design for Class A featured a "Notice" signal word on a blue header. The Class B design did not have a default signal word, which would be placed on a black header with white text. Directional arrows were also placed into Z35.3, but were no longer a standalone sign type. Most of the standard duplicated Z35.1-1972, such as sign placement, sizes, lettering, symbols and general layout of the signs.

A Caution sign featuring a symbol.

Fire/Emergency

Fire/Emergency
Alternate Design

Regulatory

Regulatory
Alternate Design

== End of Z35 ==
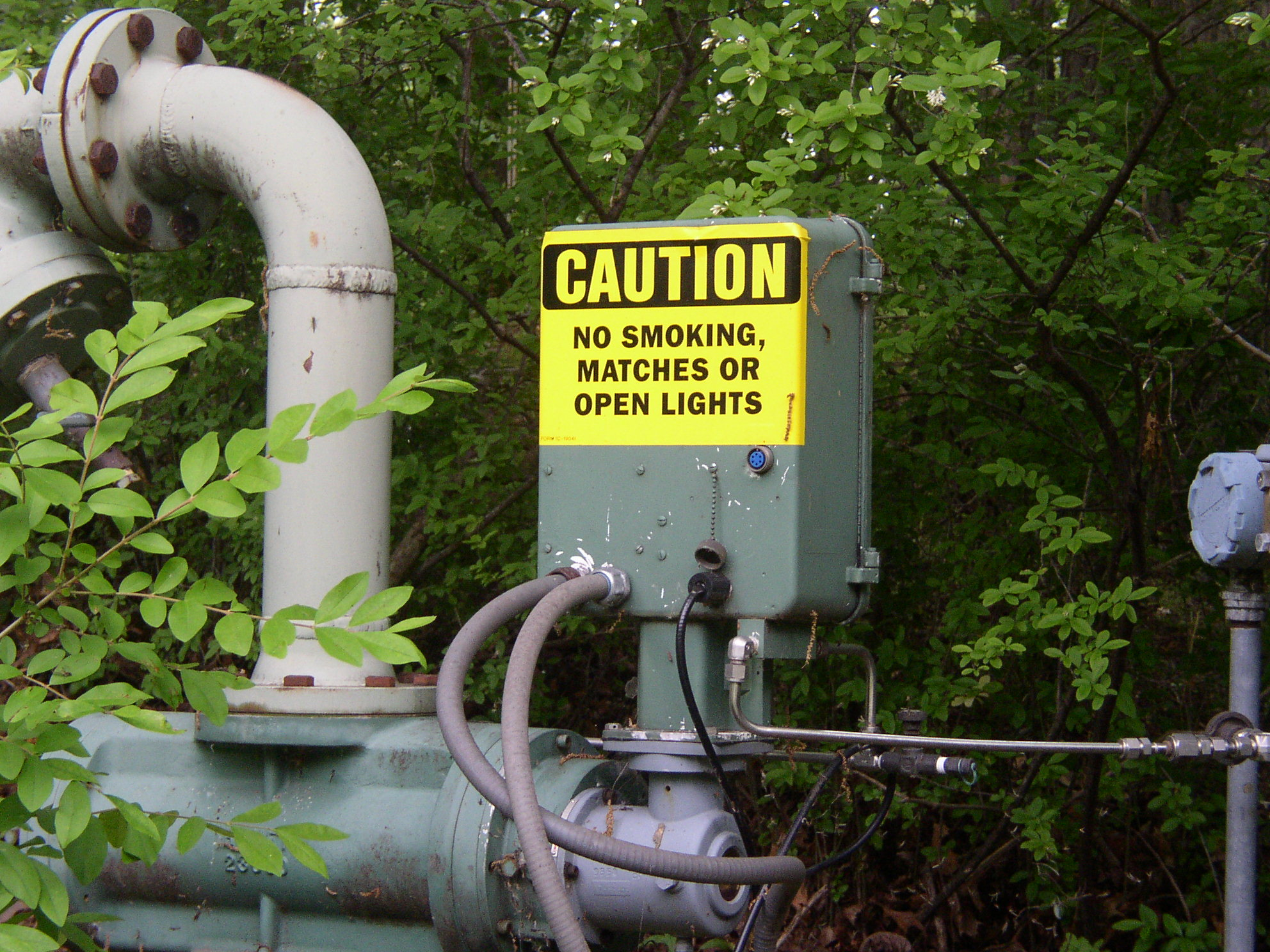
A Z35.1 "Caution" sign.

The 1970s saw major societal changes in the United States, increased globalization and recognition of a non-English speaking workforce, and changes in legal liability that would put significant responsibility on manufacturers of products and workplaces to provide suitable warnings. These changes highlighted the limitations of the nearly 40 year old standard. Recognizing the need for change, in 1979, the Z35 Committee on Safety Signs was merged with the Z53 Committee on Safety Colors, to form Z353 Committee on Safety Signs and Colors. This new committee would unveil ANSI Z535 in 1991, updating three existing standards, alongside two new standards. These new standards would provide more extensive guidance on the creation of text messages, more effective designs, and incorporating safety symbols.

=== Wording limitations ===
Z35.1 suggested easy to read and concise wording on signage. (Note: Suggested wordings in the 1941 edition included: "DANGER - NO SMOKING", "DANGER - MAN IN BOILER", "DANGER - HIGH VOLTAGE", "CAUTION - KEEP AISLES CLEAR", "CAUTION - GOGGLES MUST BE WORN WHEN OPERATING THIS MACHINE".) This often resulted in sign wordings that stated the general hazard very well, but often lacked information about how to avoid the hazard, specific nuances of the hazard, and consequences of ignoring the warning. Even more complex statements like "Caution - Operators of this machine shall wear snug fitting clothing - No gloves", still lacked any information on the possible consequences posed by wearing gloves, or loose clothing. The standard also provided minimal guidance on how to write a text message, with regards to concepts such as voice, (Note: Active voice (Keep hands clear of blade) vs. passive voice (You must keep your hands clear of blade).) length of messages, word choice, etc.; even after the removal of the lists of standardized text messages in the Fourth edition.

=== Bilingual limitations ===
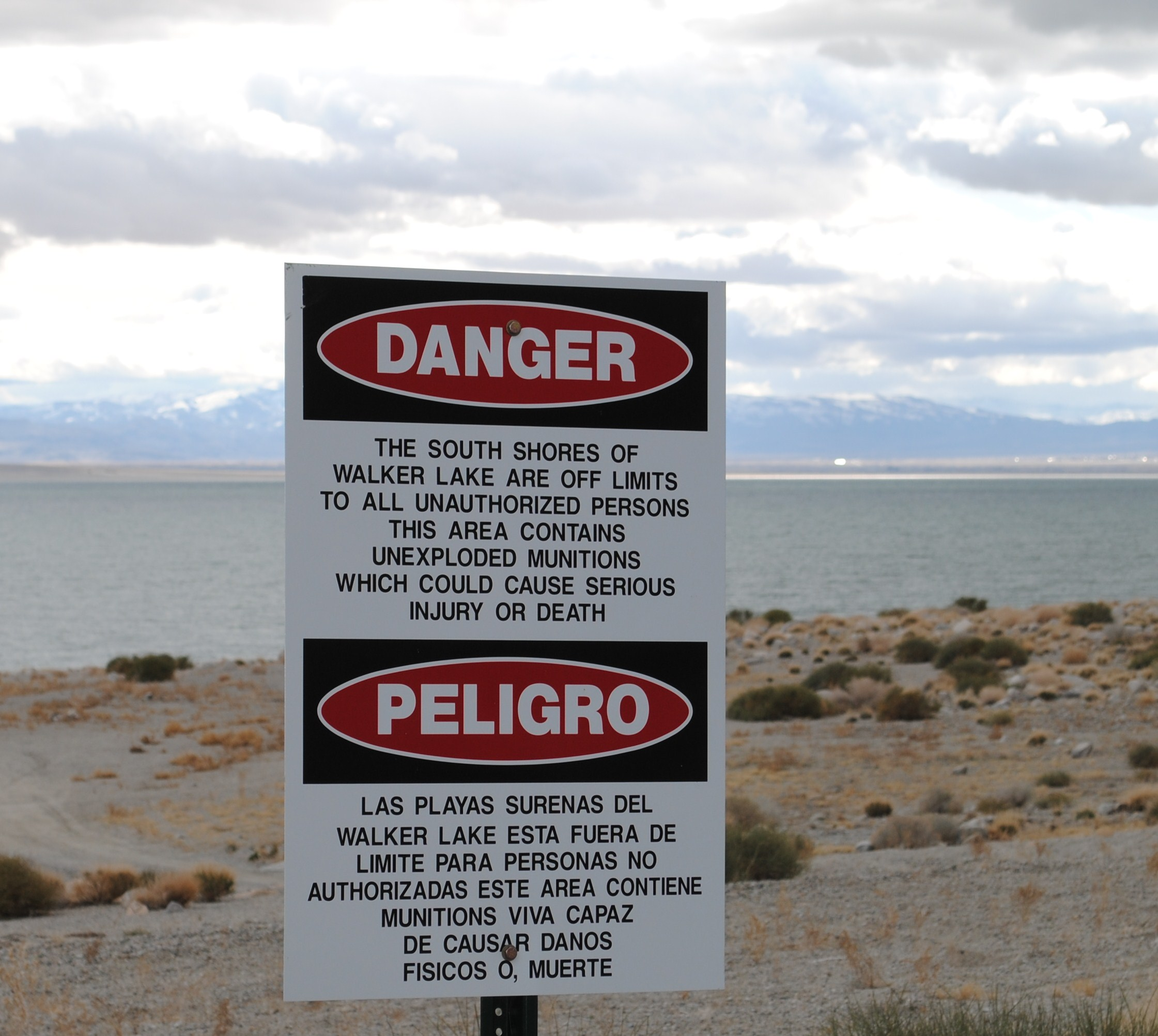
An English & Spanish 'Danger' sign.

In 1968, the year of the third edition of Z35.1, US exports and imports were valued at $45.5 & $45.3 billion respectively. By 1972, the year the fourth and final edition of Z35.1 was published, these values had climbed to $67.2 & $72.7 billion. By 1980, these had grown to $271.8 and $291.2 billion. During the 1980s, removal of trade barriers and free trade arrangements was an objective of the US Federal government. This would cumulate in the 1988 Canada–United States Free Trade Agreement. Trade with regions and populations that did not speak English was increasing, as were members of the workforce domestically who didn't speak English.

While a reason behind standardizing the designs and colors of signs in 1941, was to make signs understandable to non-English speakers, by being able to associate color and designs to severity of a hazard, this still left significant limitations. The hazards represented by "Danger" varied widely from electric hazards, to flammable or explosive materials, to toxic chemicals, which require different approaches to avoid harm. Z35.1 contained no requirement or even suggestion to provide signage in languages other than English, in a multilingual workplaces. Further, no instructions were ever provided on how to present a multi-language message with safety signage, such as English and Spanish, or what words should be used as the signal words in non-English languages. Often, the solution was to simply duplicate the sign in the other language, often placed directly below the English sign. This did have significant limitations, as manufacturers, who won't know what languages the end user of their product can read. An English/Spanish sign is unhelpful, if a user can only read Polish, for example. This issue became more important through the 1980s, as legal obligations around warnings on products and equipment changed.

The fourth edition did include some information about how to include a symbol, the guidance was rather simple:

- Symbols should be either to the right of the entire sign (word message and header), or below the header, in the word message panel area.
- Symbols should only be used after testing and approval by a suitable authority.
- Symbols should be the same color as the message text of the sign.
- Specifying the exact symbol to be used in five specific instances.

No information was provided on how to design a symbol or a catalog of symbols or suitable sources for symbols. Despite stating symbols should be tested, no information was provided on how to test the symbols, or what authorities should be to approving symbols.

=== Legal duties ===
In 1960, Henningsen v. Bloomfield Motors, Inc. signaled the end of privity of contract and the need to prove negligence on the part of the manufacturer. This would mark the start of a major shift nationwide towards the concept strict liability. The Restatement of Torts (Second) would be published in the mid-1960s and in time adopted by the majority of states. Section 402A introduced the concept of a strict liability that placed responsibility on manufacturers to ensure that users of products were aware of dangers posed by their products. In 1972, the Consumer Product Safety Act embowered the newly formed Consumer Product Safety Commission to implement safety standards for consumer products, which included requiring a product be marked or accompanied with adequate warnings and instructions, and the ability to mandate specific warning designs.

By the late 1970s and through the 1980s, numerous lawsuits dealing with injuries and deaths resulting from accidents where it was found by courts that companies were responsible, in situations where provided warnings were insufficient. It was no longer enough to indicate a hazard existed. In addition to that, the severity of the hazard and consequences of being exposed to hazard needed to be clear. Ultimately Z35.1 design was not up to this task. Effective warning signs and labels came into the spotlight as the 1970s closed, with court cases like Gordon v. Niagara Machine & Tool Works. The court found that a warning placed only in a repair service manual was ineffective, as an operator would fail to see the warning. Further, it was reasonable for manufacturer to know that an operator was unlikely to see a warning in a service manual.

By the early 1980s, courts were also ruling that companies couldn't defend themselves by stating they failed to realize a warning was inadequate. This meant that companies were now incentivized to implement the most through and robust warnings possible, as an inadequate warning could leave them open to liability.

In the 1980 court case, American Optical Co. v. Weidenhamer, a factory worker suffered a serious eye injury after a piece of metal went through the safety glasses he was wearing. He had not been aware the glasses were not unbreakable, as a provided warning had been removed by another worker in charge of supplying the safety glasses to workers. The worker in charge of the safety glasses had seen the tag on the glasses for years, but failed to read it, or recognize its importance. The warning (Note: The warning text was "CAUTION - These Super Armorplate (R) lenses are impact resistant but are NOT unbreakable. Clean and inspect lenses frequently. Pitted or scratched lenses reduce vision and seriously reduces protection. Replace immediately. Meets ANSI Z87. 1-1968 363B.") was a 1 inch (25 mm) circular tag attached to the nosepiece of the glasses, with 1/32 inch (0.79 mm) letters. The court determined that warnings needed to give an accurate perspective as to the type and risk posed by the hazard and be designed in a way that it will be easily seen by the product user.

In Freund v. Cellofilm Properties, Inc., a worker was seriously burned while cleaning a paint mixer, when highly flammable nitrocellulose dust ignited. While containers the nitrocellulose was provided in contained a warning message, this warning was ultimately largely directed at individuals transporting the material, not workers handling it at a manufacturing plant, and contained limited directions on handling it. The 1982 case, Blackwell Burner Co. V. Cerda, a highway worker was burned when a hose on a kerosene weed burner for heating asphalt, disconnected, spraying the worker with kerosene that ignited. The hose had been improperly repaired, which failed suddenly. While warnings were provided in a manual, the equipment itself contained no warnings about the hose separating or the risks that unauthorized repairs posed to a user.

A New Jersey case, Campos v. Firestone Tire & Rubber Co., was reversed in 1984, in favor of a worker who had placed his hand inside a tire safety cage and was injured when the tire suddenly exploded. While a warning was provided in English to not place hands inside the tire cage, a symbol had not been provided. The worker was unable to read English.

=== Moving away from Z35.1 ===
Companies and organizations began to migrate away from Z35.1 on their own, particularly for safety labels intended for consumer products, and industrial equipment.

A high voltage safety label, designed according to FMC Corp.'s 1980 standards.

Manufacturers FMC Corporation and Westinghouse Electric Corp. both devised their own manuals for designing safety labels for their products and equipment. FMC Corporation's Product Safety Sign and Label System included master artwork of symbols and label layouts, and detailed directions on various aspects of label design, far beyond anything provided in Z35.1.

In reaction to the changing legal landscape, as well as incidents where children had been injured by unsecured Pad-mounted transformers, members of the National Electrical Manufacturers Association set out to design a new label to discourage children from playing near equipment and warn the public to notify the power company of unsecured equipment. While NEMA Standard 260, introduced in 1983 is known for memorable symbol, Mr. Ouch, the standard consisted of a label design that deviated heavily from Z35.1. The new label design included a new header design, including the 'international alert symbol' on a single solid background. The message text went beyond just stating the hazard posed, including the possible injuries, how to avoid them, and what to do if the equipment wasn't secured. These additions helped impress the gravity of the hazard, and alerted the public of the importance of reporting unsecured equipment, and to who it should be reported.

Despite Z535's introduction in 1991, Z35.1-1968 would persist in American industry and workplaces into the 2010s, due to OSHA's CFR 1910.145 and CFR 1926.200, which explicitly required use of signage that complied with Z35.1-1968. OSHA would confirm this in Standard Interpretations letters in 1983 and 2011. In 1983, OSHA stated that alternate standards or designs, such as NEMA Standard 260, could only supplement and not replace Z35.1-1968 compliant signage when required by OSHA regulations. In 2011, OSHA did state that if an employer was using a sign that was not compliant with OSHA regulations, but was complaint with a newer, current consensus standard, that provided equal or greater protection to employees, it was still a violation, however it "may be considered de minimis and not be cited." In 2013, OSHA updated CFR 1910.145, and § 1926.200 to allow use of either the older Z35.1-1968 standard or the then current ANSI Z535-2011, as well as including language that allowed usage of whatever the current ANSI standard was in the future, negating the need for further revisions when standard revisions were released. The changes did not withdraw the Z35.1 designs, allowing a workplace to continue using the designs.

== Z35.2 ==
Z35.2 was a related standard titled Specifications for Accident Prevention Tags, that entered development in the mid 1960s, spun off from Z35. It was first published on 18 September 1968. The committee initially considered making the standard for both tags and labels, before ultimately deciding against inclusion of labels. The tags were specifically intended for temporary warnings of hazards, and not at as a replacement for Z35.1's accident prevention signs. Example of uses were during the lockout-tagout process of machinery for repair, marking defective or broken equipment awaiting removal for repair. The standard laid out six standardized designs: Do Not Start, Danger, Caution, Out of Order, Radiation, Biological Hazard. It was superseded in 1991 by ANSI Z535.5, American National Standard for Safety Tags and Barricade Tapes (for Temporary Hazards).

Do Not Start

Danger

Caution

Out of Order

Radiation

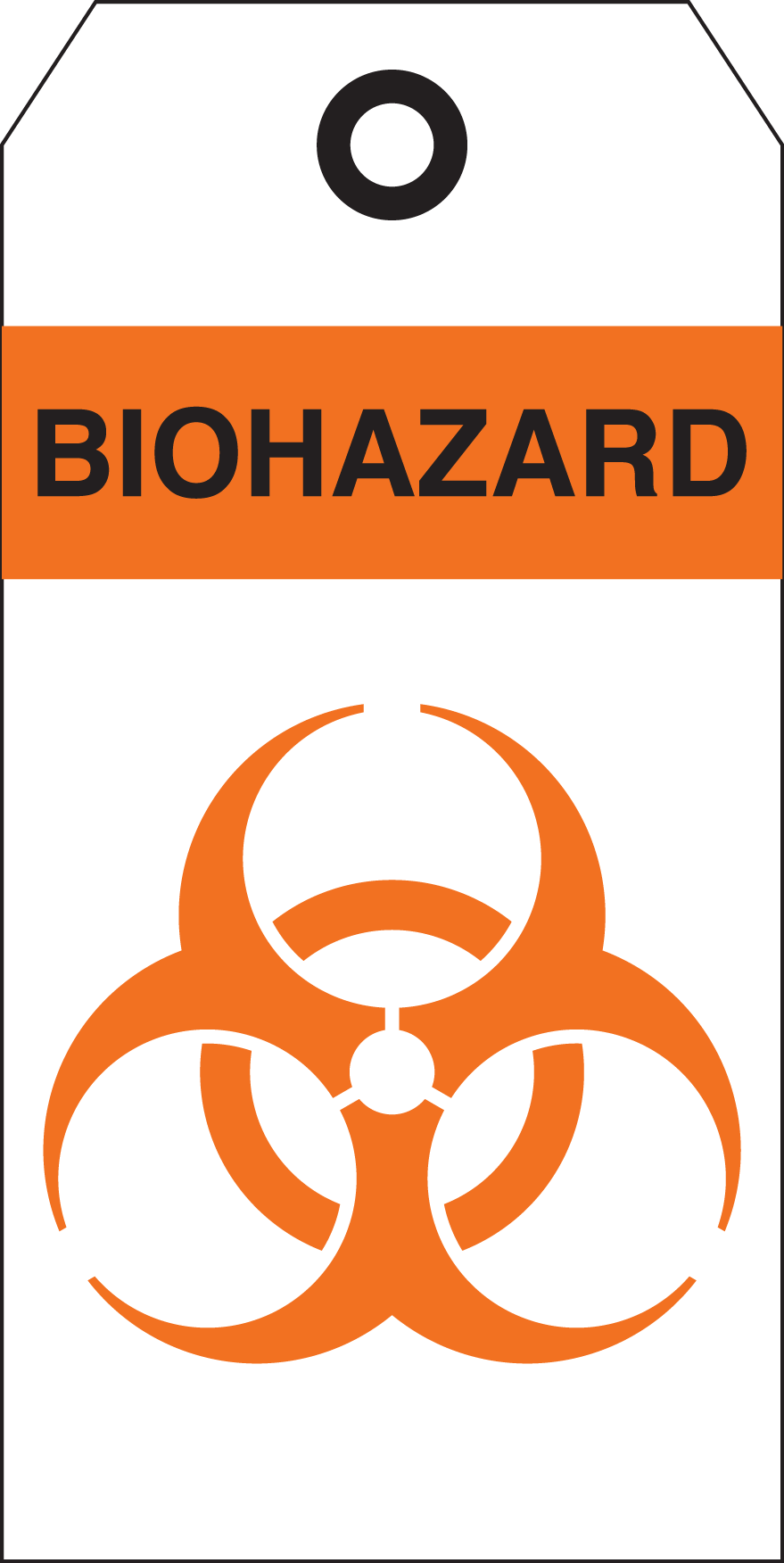
Biohazard

== See also ==
- ANSI Z535 - Successor standard
- ISO 3864 - Similar international standard
