= Wet floor =

Wet floor may refer to:

- Wet floor sign
- Wet floor effect
