= Travel warning =

Government safety warning for foreign travel

A travel warning, travel alert, or travel advisory is an official warning statement issued by government agencies to provide information about the relative safety of travelling to or visiting one or more specific foreign countries or destinations. The purpose is to enable travelers to make an informed decision about a particular travel destination, and to help travellers prepare adequately for what may be encountered on their trip. In the United States, travel warnings are issued by the Department of State and are often called warden messages.

Travel advisories may relate to issues such as inclement weather, security matters, civil unrest or disease.

== Countries issuing warnings ==
The following countries regularly publish travel warnings to their citizens:

- Australia
- Austria
- Belgium
- Bulgaria
- Canada (Canadian citizens can register in an online list before traveling abroad.)
- Croatia
- Cyprus
- Czech Republic
- Denmark
- Estonia
- Finland
- France
- Germany (German citizens can register in an online list before traveling abroad.)
- Hong Kong
- Hungary
- India
- Indonesia
- Ireland
- Israel
- Italy
- Japan
- Latvia
- Lithuania
- Luxembourg
- Malta
- Mexico
- Netherlands
- New Zealand
- Norway
- Poland
- Portugal
- Romania
- Singapore
- Slovakia
- South Korea
- Spain
- Sweden
- Switzerland (Swiss citizens can register in an online list before traveling abroad. Registered persons will get a message if the situation in their destination country changes for the worse.)
- Taiwan
- Turkey (Turkish citizens can also directly reach to Turkish diplomatic missions in the country they are visiting via phone in case of an emergency.)
- United Kingdom
- United States
