= Optical radiation =

Part of the electromagnetic spectrum

Optical radiation is the part of the electromagnetic spectrum with wavelengths between 100 nm and 1 mm. This range includes visible light, infrared light, and part of the ultraviolet spectrum. Optical radiation is non-ionizing, and can be focused with lenses and manipulated by other optical elements. Optics is the study of how to manipulate optical radiation.

== Sources ==
Warning safety sign for optical radiation; e.g. solar radiation, electric arcs, sunbeds, etc. defined by ISO 7010 standard

Warning safety sign for a laser beam defined by ISO 7010 standard

Optical radiation may be divided into two types:

Artificial optical radiation
Artificial optical radiation is produced by artificial sources, including coherent sources such as lasers and incoherent sources such as UV lights, common light bulbs, radiant heaters, welding equipment, etc.
Natural optical radiation
Natural optical radiation is primarily produced by the Sun.

== Effects ==
Exposure to optical radiation can result in negative health effects. All wavelengths across this range of the spectrum, from UV to IR, can produce thermal injury to the surface layers of the skin, including the eye. When it comes from natural sources, this sort of thermal injury might be called a sunburn. However, thermal injury from infrared radiation could also occur in a workplace, such as a foundry, where such radiation is generated by industrial processes. At the other end of this range, UV light has enough photon energy that it can cause direct effects to protein structure in tissues, and is well established as carcinogenic in humans. Occupational exposures to UV light occur in welding and brazing operations, for example.

Excessive exposure to natural or artificial UV-radiation means immediate (acute) and long-term (chronic) damage to the eye and skin. Occupational exposure limits may be one of two types: rate limited or dose limited. Rate limits characterize the exposure based on effective energy (radiance or irradiance, depending on the type of radiation and the health effect of concern) per area per time, and dose limits characterize the exposure as a total acceptable dose. The latter is applied when the intensity of the radiation is great enough to produce a thermal injury.

== Specifications ==
The European Union (EU) has laid down minimum harmonized requirements for the protection of workers against the risks arising from exposure to Artificial Optical Radiation (e.g. UVA, laser, etc.) in the Directive 2006/25/EC. A non-binding guide to good practice for implementing Directive 2006/25/EC "Artificial Optical Radiation" is available on this page.
