= Floor marking tape =

Heavy duty adhesive tape

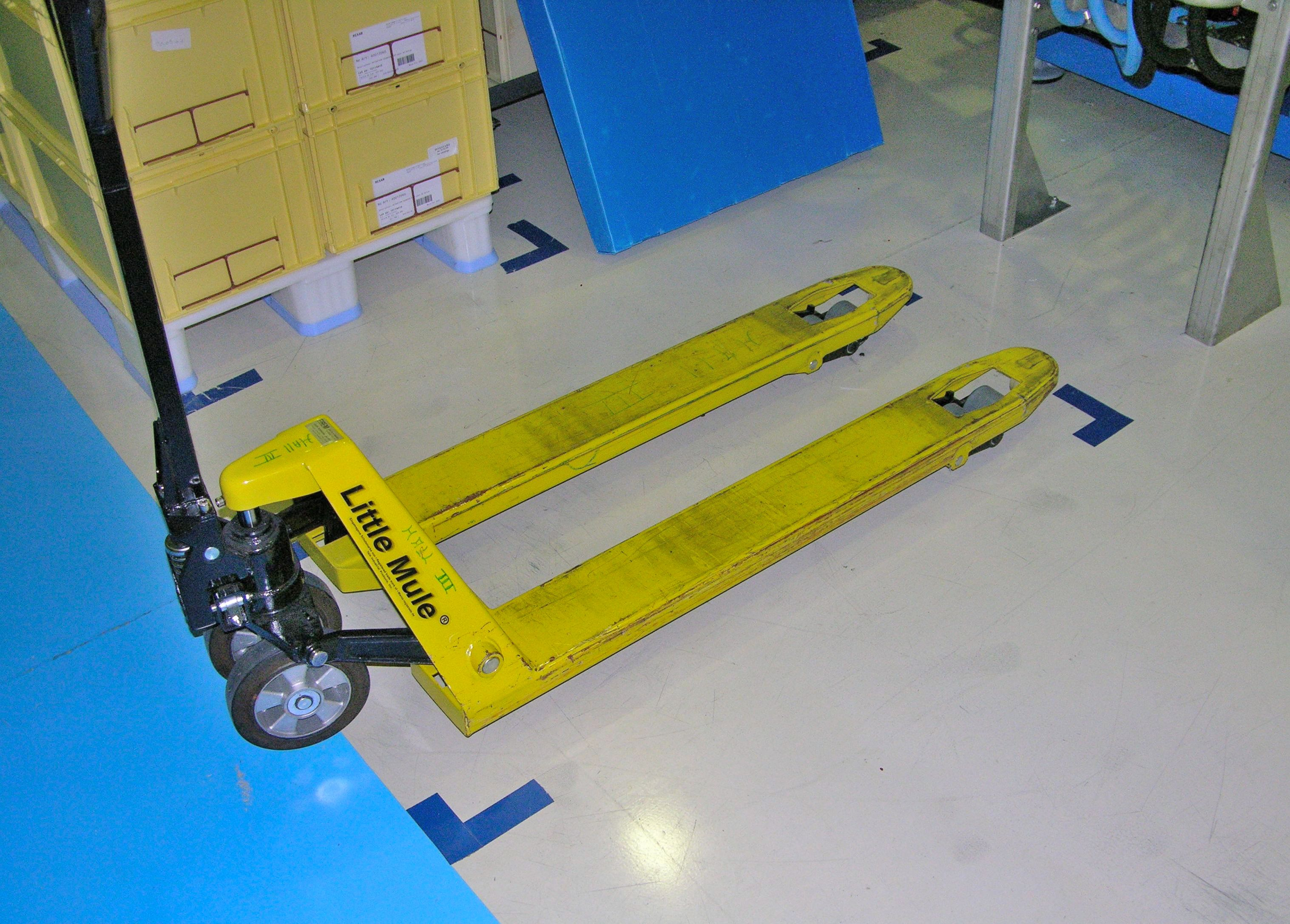
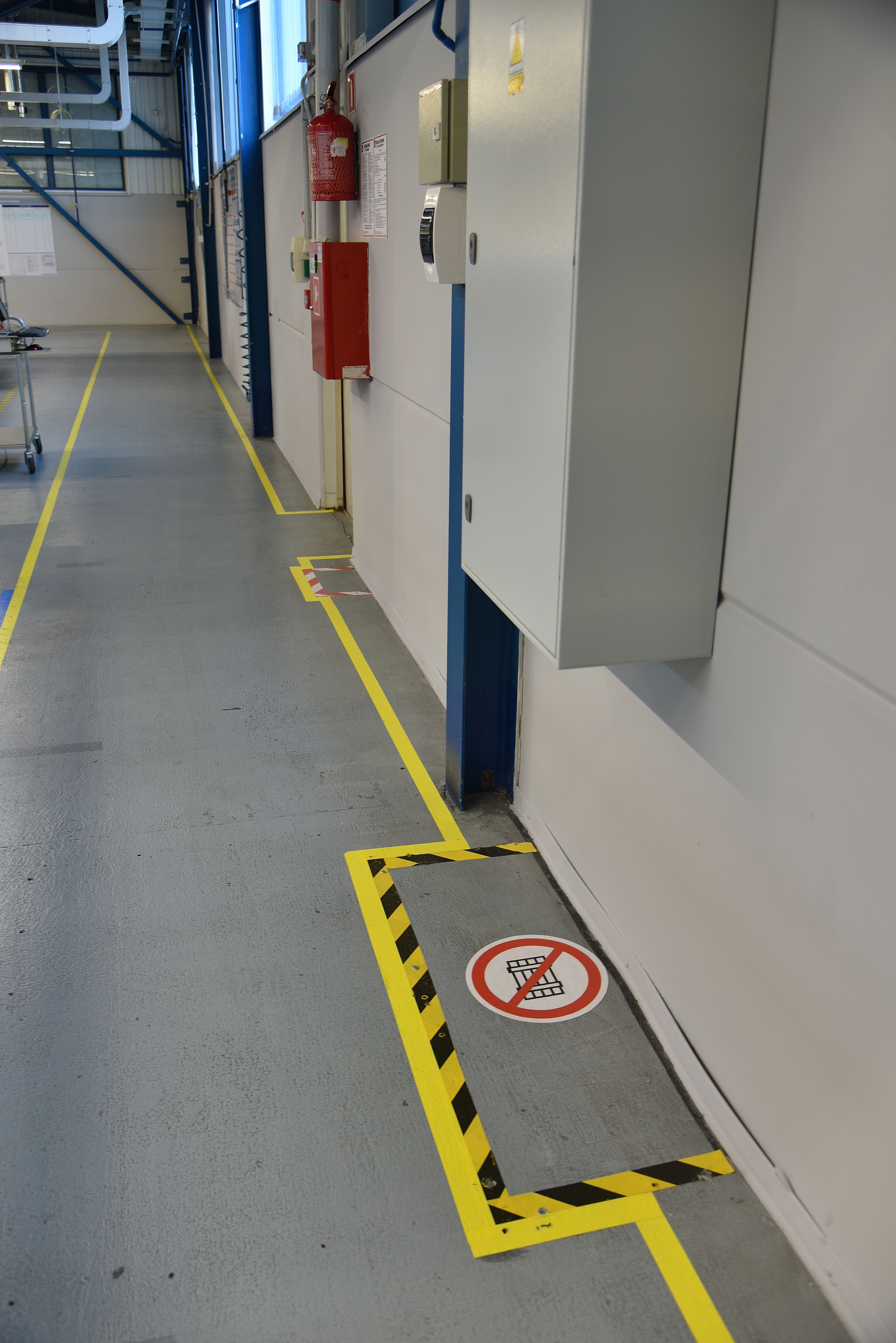
Tape being used to designate a pallet jack storage area (left) and to mark aisles and an area around an electrical panel that must remain unobstructed (right).

Floor marking tapes are adhesive tapes used to mark hazards, divide spaces, create aisles, or provide directions. They are commonly used in industrial and manufacturing facilities for floor marking. They are made of multiple different materials, including PVC and vinyl, and vary in thickness from 5-mils to 55-mils for a wide range of durability options for manufacturing facility floor marking. The best floor marking tapes are usually 50 to 60 mils thick. Most tapes come in a variety of color options and even hazard patterns to meet U.S. Occupational Safety and Health Administration/ANSI requirements and other safety standards. Some tapes are made with higher reflectivity and may even glow in the dark.

Floor marking tapes can also be useful for helping workers put materials and equipment back in the right place, making it a key 5S, Lean manufacturing implementation tools. Creating distinctions between finished goods, raw goods, to-be-repaired goods, and equipment ensures mistakes are minimized and productivity and safety are both at the highest levels.

== Usage ==
=== 5S and Lean manufacturing ===
Floor markings are an important part of step 2 of 5S, Set In Order (Seiton), organizing workspaces by denoting walkways, work spaces and storage spaces. In addition, floor markings are used to denote requirements to keep the area in front of fire extinguishers, fire hoses, first aid equipment and exits clear.

Hiroyuki Hirano's 5 Pillar of the Visual Workplace, proposed a scheme for markings that used not only color, but the size of the line and if the line was solid or broken, to convey meaning, expanding the possible messages that could be communicate, with only three colors.

| Color | Line type and width | Meaning |
|---|---|---|
| Red | Solid line 100 mm (3.9 in) | Fire Protection equipment and apparatus |
| Yellow | Broken line 100 mm (3.9 in) | Exit and entry lines |
| Yellow | Broken line 100 mm (3.9 in) | Door swing lines |
| Yellow | Arrow | Designate traffic direction flow |
| White | Solid line 50 mm (2.0 in) | Place markers for in-process inventory |
| White | Corner line 50 mm (2.0 in) | Place markers for operations |
| White | Broken line 30 mm (1.2 in) | Place marker for non-production and inventory items (Ashtrays, clipboards, etc. |
| Red | Solid line 30 mm (1.2 in) | Storage area for defective goods |
| Black Yellow | Striped Line; 30 mm (1.2 in) | Marking hazards |

=== Building evacuation ===
Starting in 2009, the International Fire Code required structures over 75 feet (23 m) to have exit paths and stairway steps marked by a luminous path to guide people evacuating to the exit. A way of satisfying this requirement is photoluminescent tape, which glows in darkness without any external power source. The IFC also requires that obstacles that are within 6.5 feet (2.0 m) of the floor surface be marked with luminescent striped tape, with an alternating striped pattern of luminous material and non-luminous black.

NFPA 101 also requires egress signage to be provided in most occupancies--including, but not limited to, assembly, educational, hotels, mercantile, and business--on exits other than main exterior doors that are not obvious and identifiable as exits. These markings need to be visible from any direction of the exit access and are required to be internally or externally illuminated. The illumination of the exit markings needs to be confirmed via a visual inspection at intervals not exceeding 30 days. If the occupancy is also required to have emergency lighting, these illuminated exit signs need to be provided with emergency power. The same methods of testing the emergency lighting can be used for testing the exit marking illumination emergency power as well.

=== OSHA regulations ===
OSHA does not have a specific standard for floor marking regarding color or design. However other rules and policy interpretations has provided some guidelines.

1910.176(a) and 1910.22(b)(2), requires when mechanical handling equipment, such as forklifts and Powered industrial trucks are used, that permanent aisles and passageways must be marked. In May 1972, OSHA clarified that it considers 'appropriately marked' to mean a line at least 2 inches (51 mm) wide, with the recommendation being a line between 2–6 inches (51–152 mm) wide. The agency also indicated that any color could be used and that the line could be continuous or formed by a series of dots, squares, stripes, as long as it was clear it defined an aisle area. A 1978 interpretation further clarified that other means of marking an aisle, such as traffic cones or flags, in environments where painted lines were impractical, was also acceptable.

== Materials ==
=== Tape ===
Tapes are replacement for paints for floor marking. Tapes are much faster and easier to install and replace, which dramatically reduces down times related to painting aisles and rails. Many floor tapes are scuff and break resistant, unlike paints that will chip and scratch off. Tapes that are printed with stripes, chevrons and Sillitoe tartan patterns are far easier and faster to install than the same patterns when painted. Floor tapes also have a storage advantage, with being less temperamental, with longer shelf lives than paints. However, tape does have drawbacks. It can tear, peel and fail to adhere to some floor surfaces. Further, tape can introduce a trip hazard if it is peeling.

== See also ==
- List of adhesive tapes
- Barricade tape
- Safety sign
- 5S
- Lean manufacturing
