= Safety sign =

Type of sign

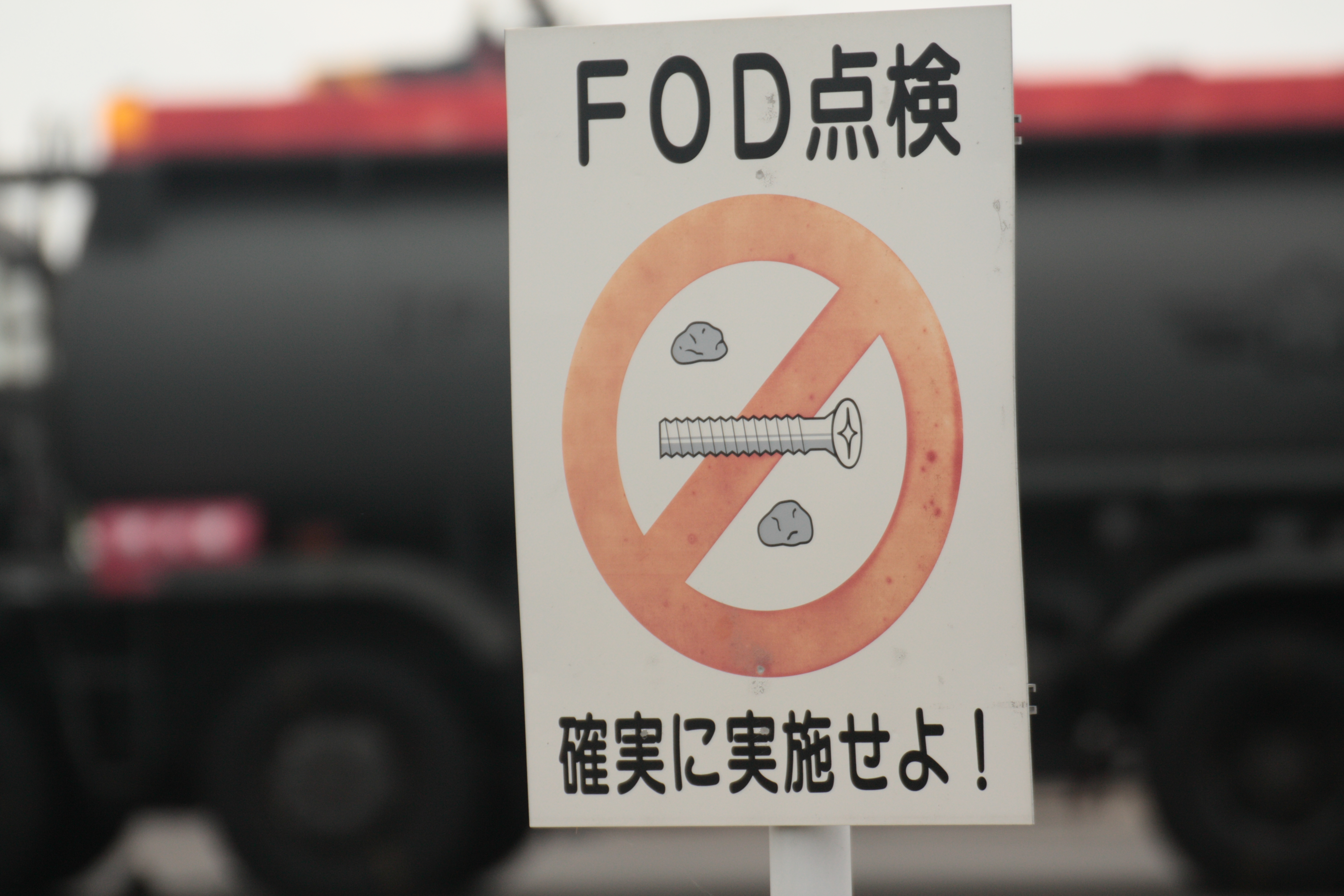
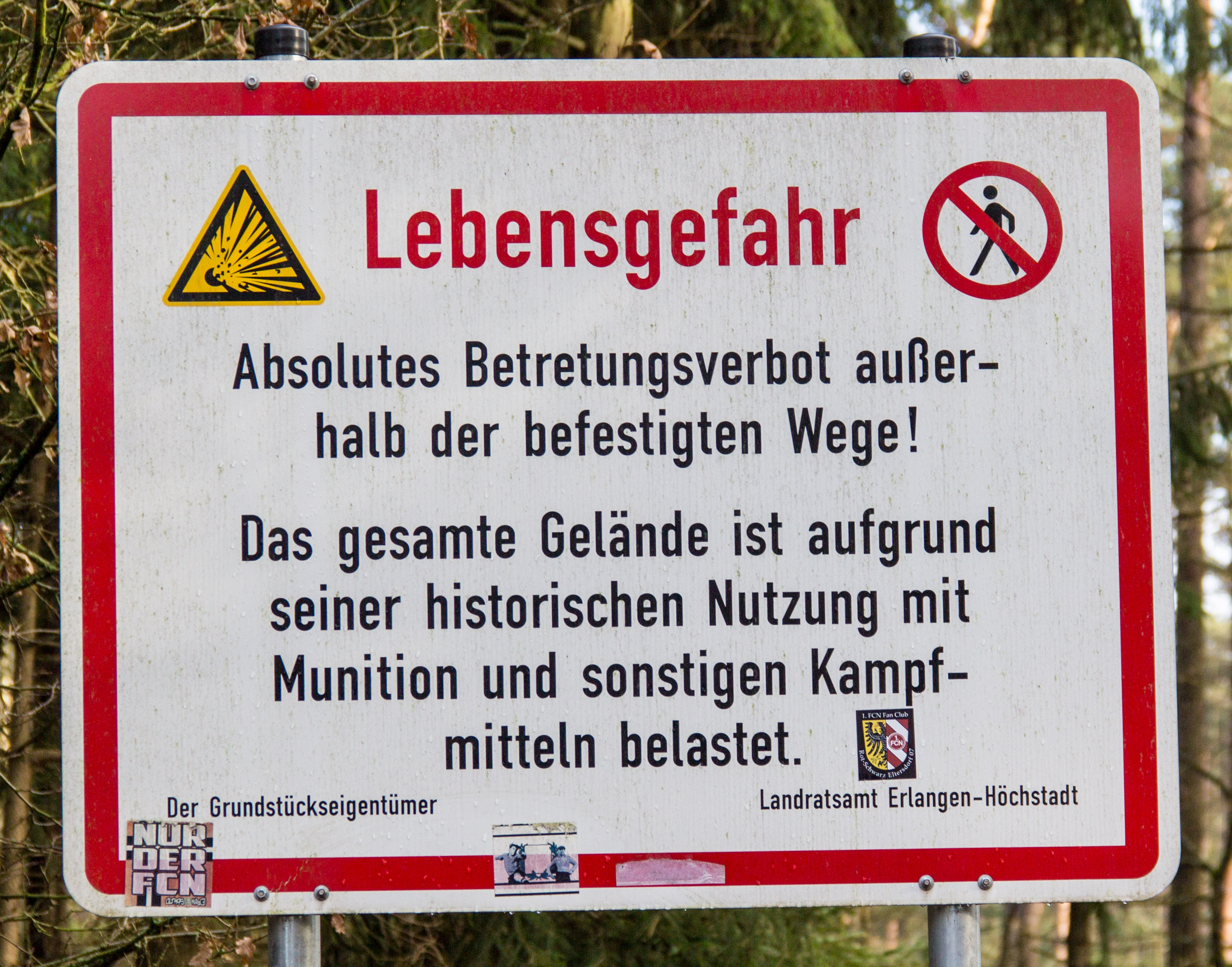
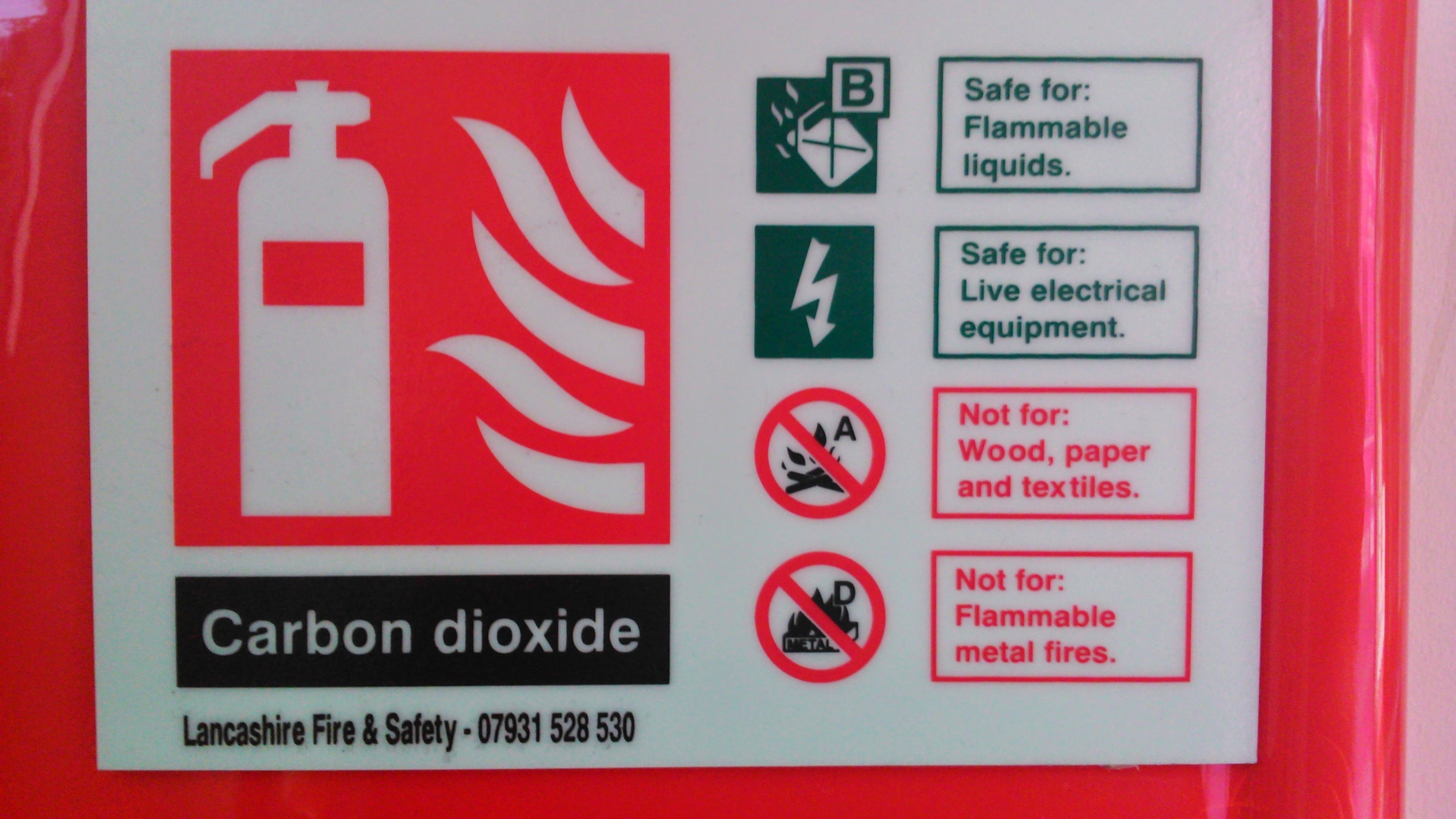
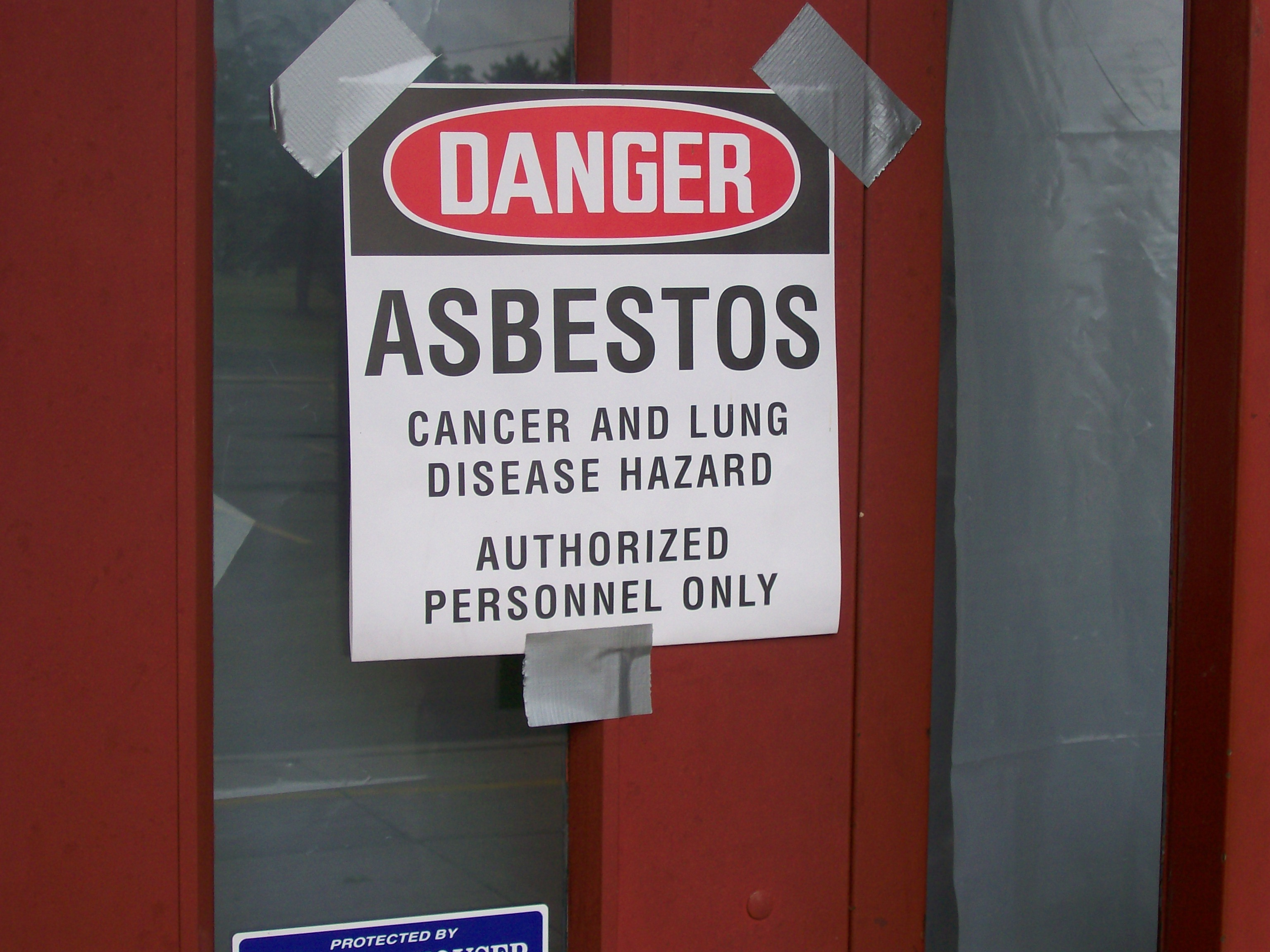
Various safety signs from around the world.
Clockwise from upper left: Sign prohibiting foreign objects on a runway, Japan; Stay on paths, unexploded bombs, Germany; Asbestos danger, United States; Fire extinguisher, ISO.

A safety sign is a sign designed to warn of hazards, indicate mandatory actions or required use of personal protective equipment, prohibit actions or objects, identify the location of firefighting or safety equipment, or marking of exit routes.

In addition to being encountered in industrial facilities; safety signs are also found in public places and communities, at electrical pylons and electrical substations, cliffs, beaches, bodies of water, on motorized equipment, such as lawn mowers, and areas closed for construction or demolition.

== History ==
=== In the United States ===
==== Early signs and ASA Z35.1 ====
A 'Danger' sign from the 1914 Universal Safety Standards

One of the earliest attempts to standardize safety signage in the United States was the 1914 Universal Safety Standards. The signs were fairly simple in nature, consisting of an illuminated board with "DANGER" in white letters on a red field. An arrow was added to draw attention to the danger if it was less obvious. Signs indicating exits, first aid kits consisted of a green board, with white letters. The goal with signs was to inform briefly. The next major standards to follow were ASA (Note: American Standards Association, a previous name for the American National Standards Institute.) Z35.1 in 1941, revised in 1959, 1968, and 1972. The Occupational Safety and Health Administration devised their requirements from ASA Z35.1-1968 in the development of their rules, OSHA §1910.145 for the usage of safety signage in workplaces.

==== ANSI Z535 ====
In the 1980s, American National Standards Institute formed a committee to update the Z53 (Note: Standard for Safety Color Code for Marking Physical Hazards and Equipment.) and Z35 standards. In 1991, ANSI Z535 was introduced, which was intended to modernize signage through increased use of symbols, the introduction of a new header, 'Warning' and requiring that wording not just state the hazard, but also the possible harm the hazard could inflict and how to avoid the hazard. Until 2013, OSHA regulations technically required usage of signage prescribed in OSHA §1910.145, based on the standard ASA Z35.1-1968. Regulation changes and clarification of the law now allow usage of signs complying with either OSHA §1910.145 or ANSI Z535 designs.

=== In Europe ===
Various European electricity warnings in use prior to 2000.

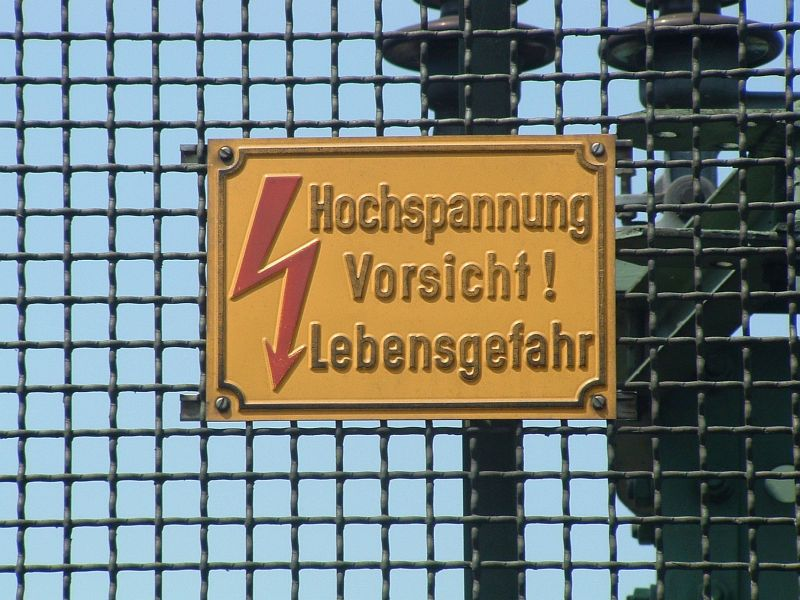
Germany

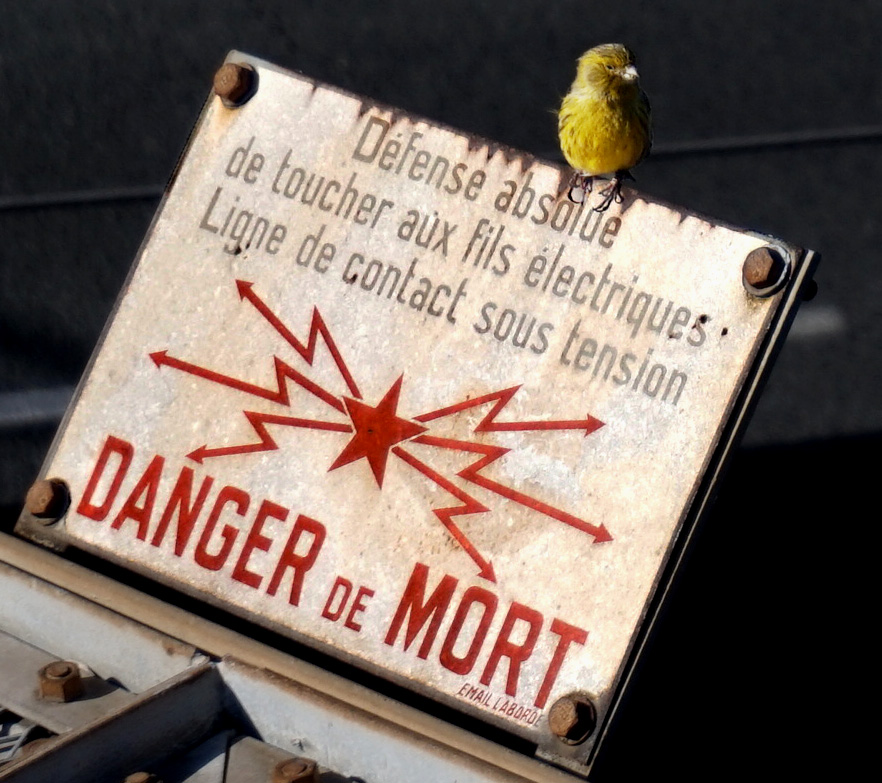
France

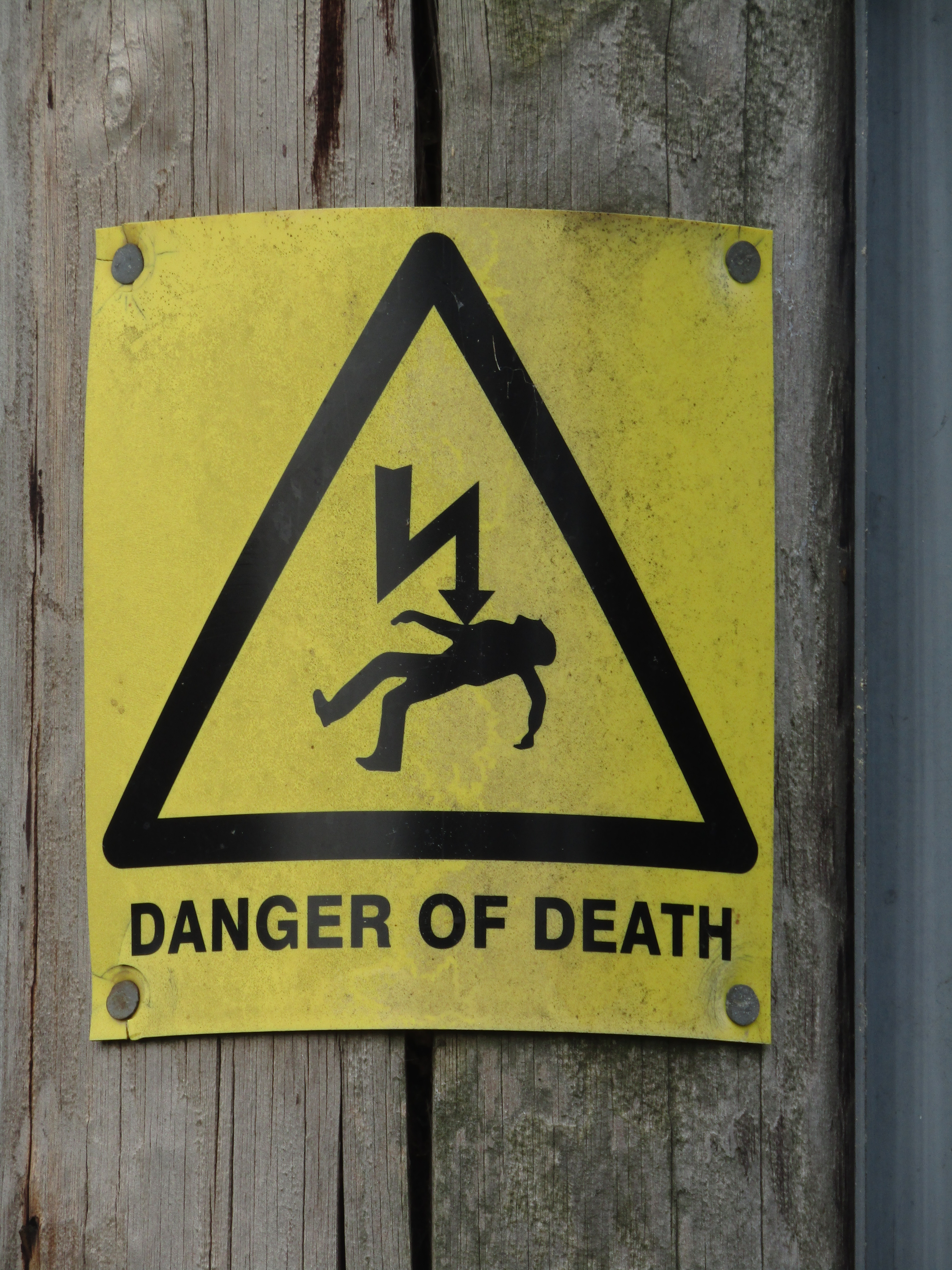
United Kingdom

Prior to widespread globalization and adoption of standards from the ISO, most countries developed their own standards for safety signage. Text only signs were common prior to introduction of European Council Directive 77/576/EEC on 25 July 1977, which required member states to have policies in place to ensure that "safety signs at all places of work conform to the principles laid down in Annex I", which required color coding and symbols. In 1992, the European Council Directive 92/58/EEC replaced EEC 77/576/EEC. The new directive included improved information on how to utilize safety signage effectively. Beyond safety signs, EEC Directive 92/58/EEC standardize markings for fire equipment, acoustic signals, verbal and hand signals for vehicle movements. In 2013, the European Union adopted ISO 7010, adopting it as European Norm (EN) ISO 7010, standardizing symbols among the EU countries. Prior to this, while symbols were provided, symbols were permitted to vary in appearance "provided that they convey the same meaning and that no difference or adaptation obscures the meaning".

=== In Australia ===
Australian safety signage started in 1952 as CZ4-1952: Safety signs for the occupational environment. It was revised and redesignated as AS1319-1972 in 1972, with further revisions taking place in 1979, 1983 and 1994. In August 2018, AS1319-1994 was reconfirmed as still being valid and not in need of major revisions.

=== In Japan ===
Examples of differences in Japanese signs.

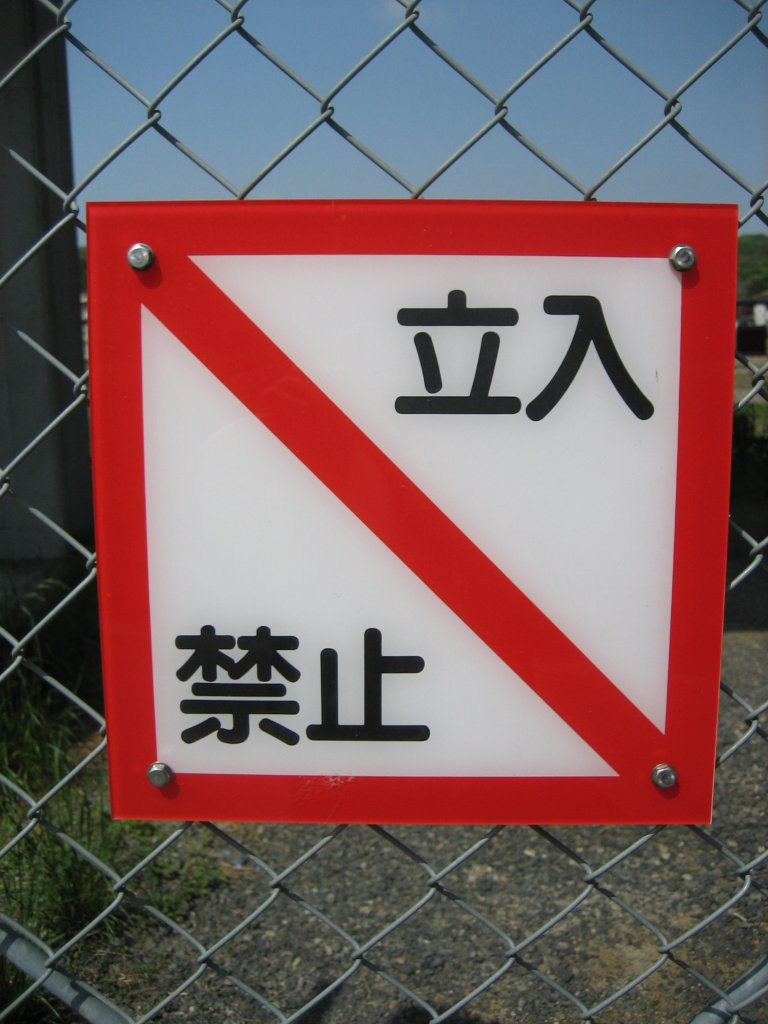
A square 'No Trespassing' sign.

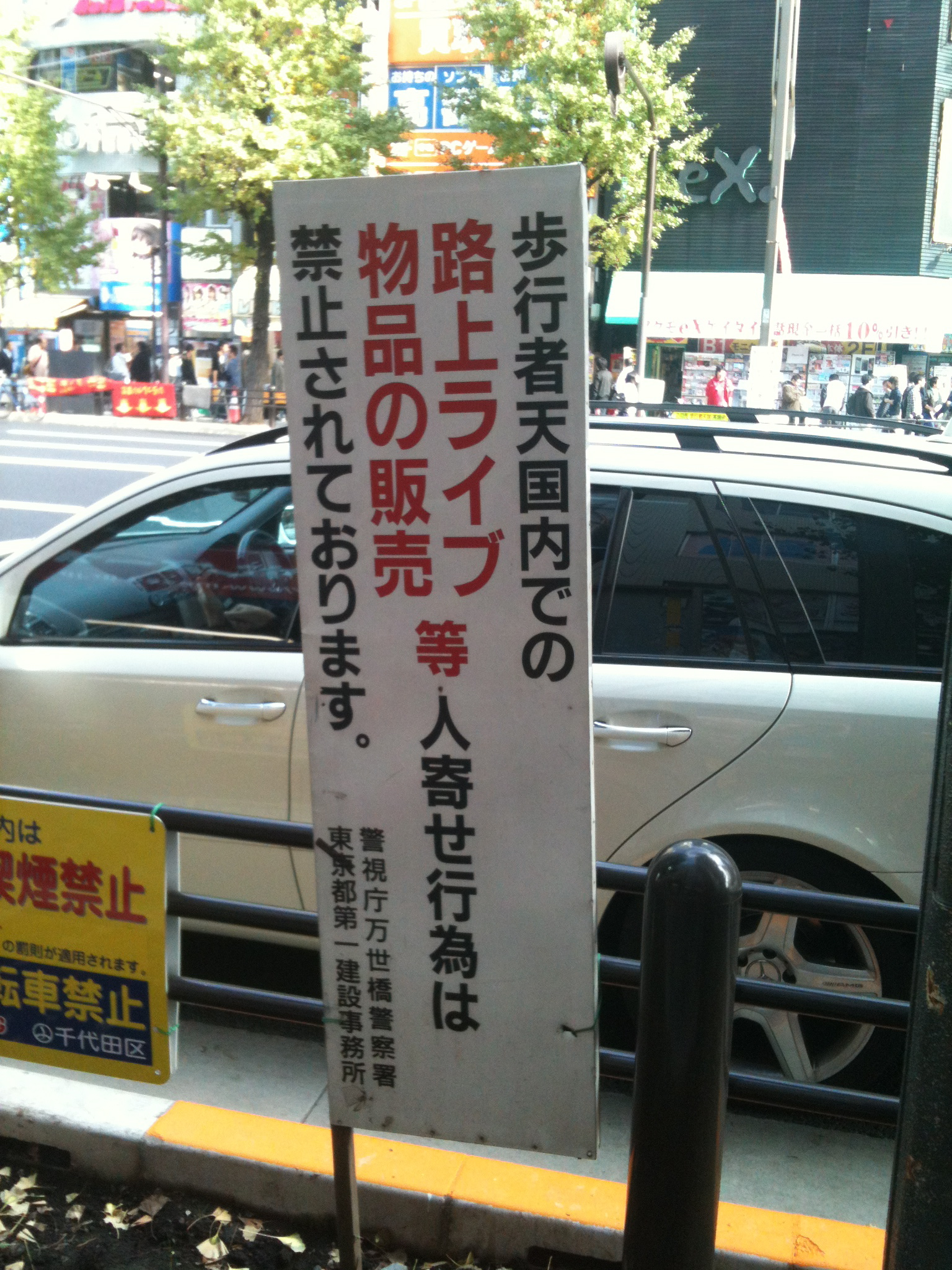
A vertical format warning sign.

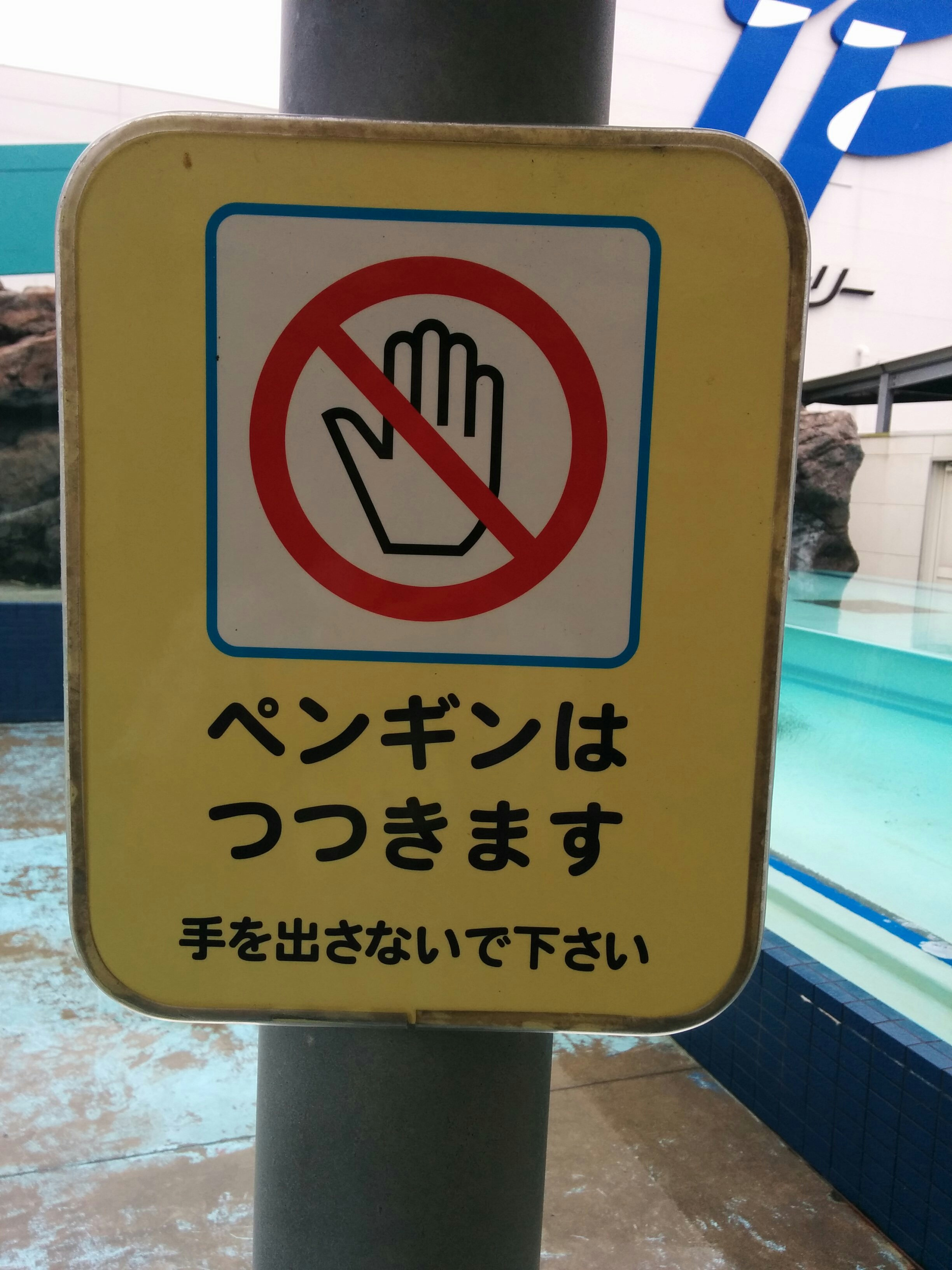
The JIS standard symbol for 'Do not touch'. (Note: Compare with the ISO 'P010 - Do not touch'.)

Japanese safety signage is notable for its clear visual differences from international norms, such as use of square 'no symbols', vertical formatting of sign text. Safety sign standards are regulated by Japanese Industrial Standards through standards JIS Z9101 (Workplace and public area safety signs) JIS Z 9103 (Safety sign colors) and JIS Z 9104 (Safety signs - General specifications). While design trends have been moving towards international norms of ISO standards, differences are still present such as the use of symbols unique to the JIS standards, using colors differently from ISO standards. (Note: Using red for "emergency button" and "emergency telephone") In addition to typical safety sign standards, Japan introduced JIS Z 9098 in 2016 specifically addressing emergency management needs: informing people of areas susceptible to natural disasters, evacuation routes and safe shelters from disasters. The standard's unique aspect is the usage of maps and diagrams to provide more detailed information about the area's hazards, shelters and evacuation routes.

=== In China ===
Chinese safety signage is regulated by Standardization Administration of China using GB standards 2893-2008 and 2894-2008, which all safety signs are legally required to comply with. Designs are similar to ISO 3864 and uses older ISO 7010:2003 symbols, while adding several additional symbols covering a wider range of prohibitions and hazards.

== Sign design and layout ==
Modern signage design typically consists of a symbol, warning text, and in the United States, Canada, Australia a header consisting of a signal word.

=== Headers ===
North American and some Australian safety signage utilize distinctive headers to draw attention to the risk of harm from a hazard. Headers have guidelines for usage, where conditions must be met to dictate which header must be used for a sign.

Header Types
OSHA/ANSI Z35.1	ANSI Z535	Signal Word	Intended Use
		Danger	Situations that will result in serious injury or death.
		Warning	Situations that could result in serious injury or death.
		Caution	Situations that could result in moderate or minor injury.
		Notice	Situations that at worst will only result in property damage and will not result in physical injuries.

The 2007 revisions to ANSI Z353.4 allowed for the 'safety alert symbol' found on 'Danger', Warning' and 'Caution' headers to be replaced with the ISO 7010 "W001 - General warning" symbol to enable compliance with ISO 3864-1 for signs used in international situations or equipment being exported abroad. Additional headers designs exist, Z53.1-1968 prescribed a magenta and yellow 'Radiation' header for radiation hazards. Other headers have been created by sign manufacturers for various situations not covered by the Z53.1 standard, such as "Security Notice", "Biohazard", "Restricted Area".

ISO Safety symbols. Clockwise from upper left: Prohibited, Warning; Safe condition; Mandatory

=== Symbols ===
As a means of overcoming language and literacy barriers, symbols depicting the hazards, required action or equipment, prohibited actions or items and safety equipment were introduced to safety signage during the 1990s. Globalization and increased international trade helped push this development, as a means of reducing costs associated with needing signage in multiple languages. Increasingly, countries are adopting symbols used by ISO 7010 and UN Globally Harmonized System of Classification and Labelling of Chemicals, that harmonizes symbols internationally to reduce confusion, and bring themselves into compliance with international standards.

== Portable signage ==
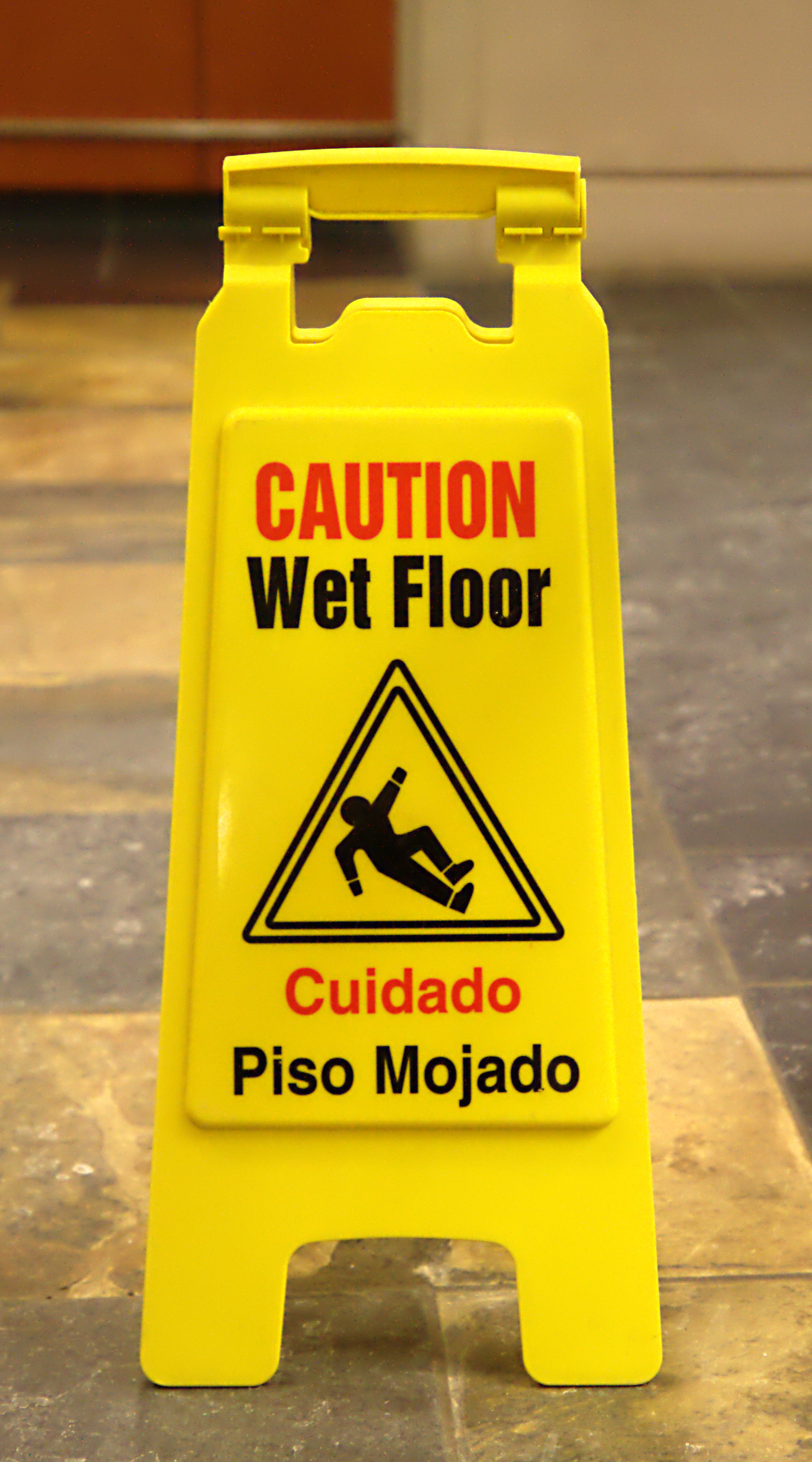
An American "Wet Floor" sign in English and Spanish

For temporary situations such as wet floors, portable signs are used. They are designed to be self supporting and relatively easy to move once the task is complete. The 1914 Universal Safety Standards provided for a portable 'Danger' sign suitable for both hard floors and soft dirt. Portable signs can take a variety of forms, from a traffic cone with stick on letters, plastic a-frame signs, to safety signs mounted on poles with bases that enable movement.

Wet floor signs are also intended to avoid the "slip and fall" legal liability from injury due to failing to warn of an unsafe condition. They are usually yellow. The warning is sometimes enhanced with new technology to provide audible warnings. Robotic cleaning equipment can use wet floor signs with sonar gadgetry to know when its job is finished.

== Effectiveness of safety signs ==
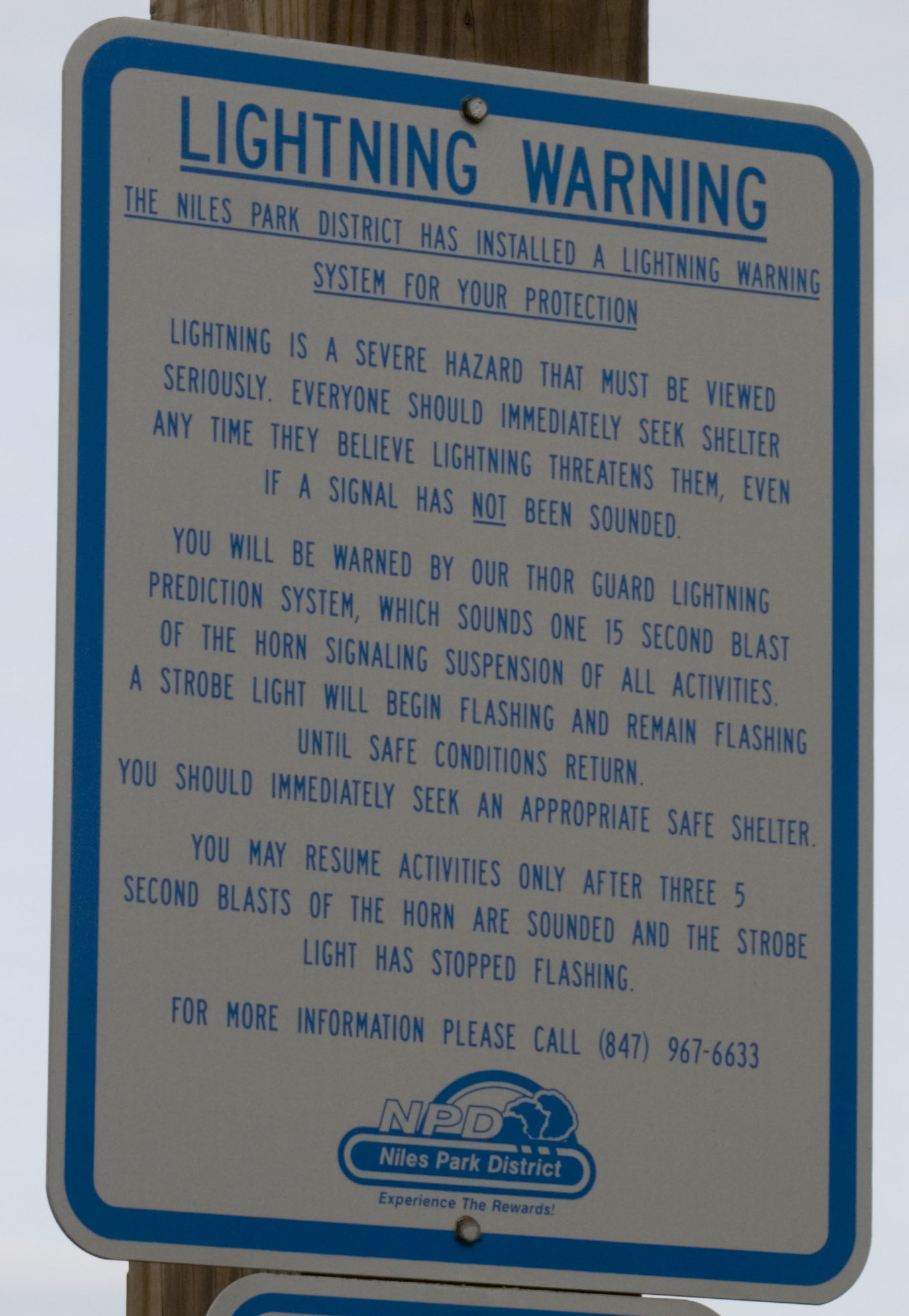
Information overload: Instructions of what to do when a lightning alarm sounds are in the second paragraph.

Since the late 1980s, more emphasis has been put on testing signage for clarity and to eliminate possible misunderstandings. Researchers have examined the impacts of using different signal words, inclusion of borders and color contrast with text and symbols against sign backgrounds. In 1999, a group of designers were tasked with creating standardized warning labels for personal watercraft. The group devised several versions of the same warning label using different symbols, wording and emphasis of key phrases through use of underlining, bold fonts and capitalizing. The label designs were reviewed by the United States Coast Guard, United States Power Squadron, industry representatives and subjected to ease of comprehension and readability tests. Results of these reviews and tests led to further revisions of words and redesigning of some symbols. The resulting labels are still applied to personal watercraft nearly 20 years after their initial design.

Placement of signs also affects the effectiveness of signs. A 1993 study tested compliance with a warning against loading the top drawer of a filing cabinet first. The warning was least effective when it was only placed on the shipping box, but most effective when placed as part of a removable cardboard sleeve that physically obstructed the top drawer, interfering with adding files to the drawer.

Sign effectiveness can be reduced by a number of factors, including information overload, where the sheer amount of information is presented in a manner that a reader is unable to process adequately, such as being confronted by a sign consisting of dozens of words with no paragraph breaks, or excessive amounts of unnecessary information. (Note: The 30.06 and 30.07 signs required in Texas to prohibit entry with a firearm provides an example of this. The 30.06 sign's message, 'Carrying a concealed handgun is prohibited', is a 36 word sentence, accompanied by an identical 36 word sentence in Spanish. The preceding 27 words simply states the specific statute of the law that gives the sign legal force.) This can be prevented through simplifying warnings down to their key points, with supplementary manuals or training covering the more nuanced and minor information. Overwarning is a related problem, where warnings are overlooked by people due to the sheer number of warnings, such as placing many safety signs together, redundant or obvious warnings. Effectiveness can be reduced through conditions such as poor maintenance, placing a sign too high or too low, or in a way that requires excessive effort to read. (Note: A top loading washing machine with a lid that opens to the side with a warning label on the lid's underside. This required a reader to bend awkwardly to read the label.)

== Technical standards ==
Title	Area	Year of Adoption	Status
ISO 3864	International	2011–2016	current
ISO 7010	International	2011	current
ISO 7001	International	2007	current
ISO 20712-1 (Note: Water Safety symbols.)	International	2008	superseded in 2018 by ISO 7010
ISO/R 557:1967 "Symbols, dimensions and layout for safety signs"	International	1967	superseded in 1984 by ISO 3864:1984
Globally Harmonized System of Classification and Labelling of Chemicals (GHS)	International	2005–2017	current
(IMO) Resolution A.1116(30)	International	2017	current
(IMO) Resolution A.760(18)	International	1993	superseded in 2017 by Resolution A.1116(30)
(IMO) Resolution A.603(15)	International	1987	superseded in 1993 by Resolution A.760(18)
Regulation (EC) No 1272/2008	European Union	2009	current
Directive 92/58/EEC	European Union	1992	current
Directive 67/548/EEC	European Union	1967	superseded in 2016 by CLP
Directive 77/576/EEC	European Union	1977	superseded in 1992 by Directive 92/58/EEC
ANSI Z535-2011	United States	2011	current
ANSI Z35.1	United States	1941	superseded in 1991 by ANSI Z535-1991
BS 5499	Great Britain		superseded in 2015 by BS EN ISO 7010
DIN 4844-2:2001	Germany	2001	superseded in 2013 by DIN EN ISO 7010
AS1319-1994 (Note: Introduced in 1952 as Australian Standard CZ4-1952, revised & redesignated AS 1319 in 1972.)	Australia	1994	current
JIS Z 9101 "Workplace and public area safety signs"	Japan	2005	current
JIS Z 9104 "General safety signs"	Japan	2005	current
JIS Z 9098 "Emergency Management Signs"	Japan	2016	current
GB 2893-2008 "Safety Colours"	China	2008	current
GB 2894-2008 "Safety Signs and Guidelines for Use"	China	2008	current

== See also ==
- Hazard symbol
- Placard
- Exit sign
- Pipe marking
- Floor marking tape
- Barricade tape
