= ISO 7010 =

Technical standard for safety symbols

ISO 7010:2019
- Graphical symbols — Safety colours and safety signs — Registered safety signs
- Abbreviation: ISO 7010
- Status: Active
- Year started: October 2003
- First published: October 2003; 22 years ago
- Latest version: 3; 2019
- Organization: International Organization for Standardization
- Committee: ISO/TC 145/SC 2 Safety identification, signs, shapes, symbols and colours
- Base standards: ISO 3864
- Domain: Safety symbol design
- Website: www.iso.org/standard/72424.html

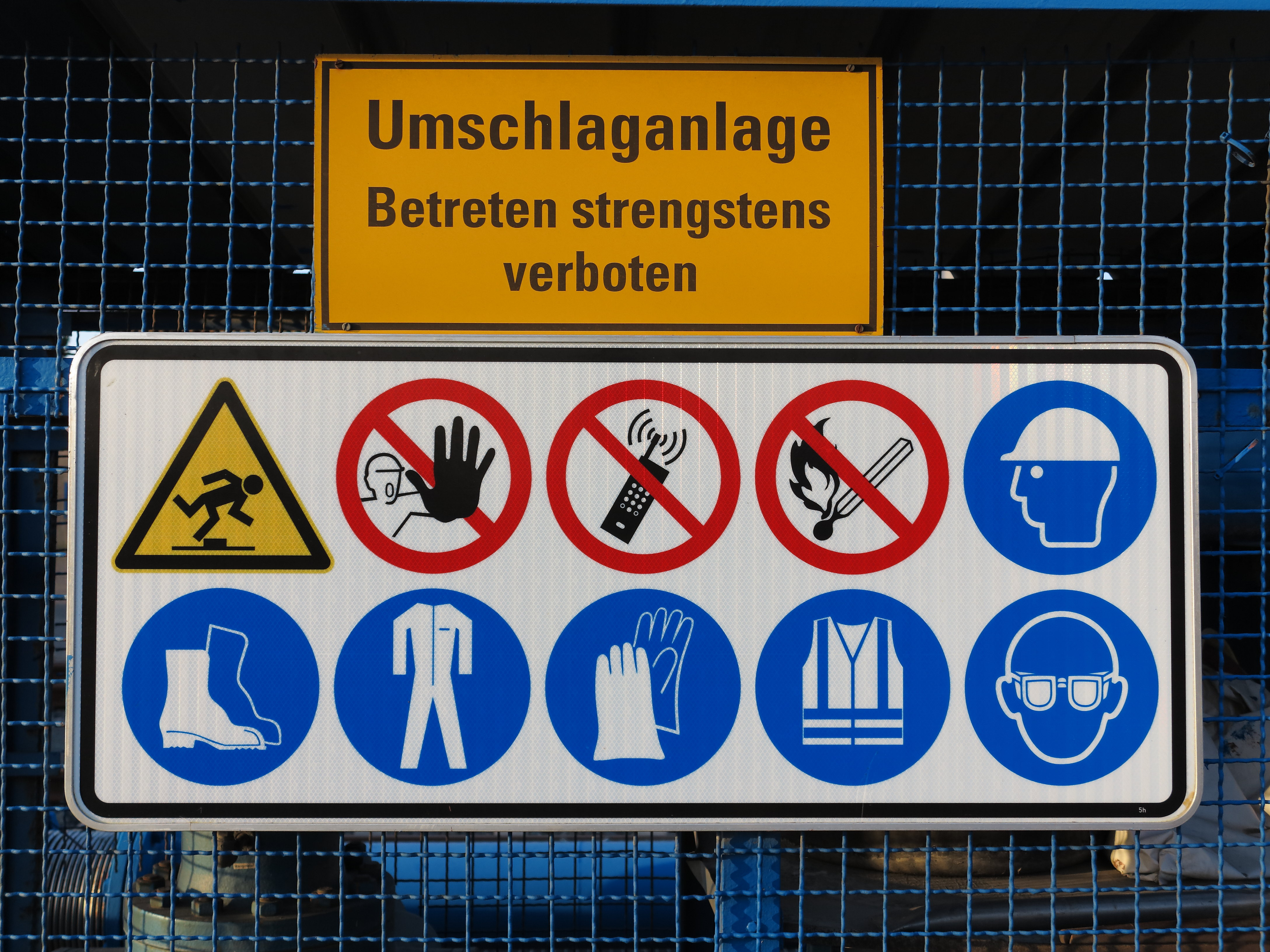
A sign with a warning symbol and various prohibition and mandatory symbols.

ISO 7010 is a technical standard by the International Organization for Standardization for graphical hazard symbols on hazard and safety signs, including those indicating emergency exits. It uses colours and principles set out in ISO 3864 for these symbols, and is intended to provide "safety information that relies as little as possible on the use of words to achieve understanding."

The standard was published in October 2003, splitting off from ISO 3864:1984, which set out design standards and colours of safety signage and merging ISO 6309:1987, Fire protection - Safety signs to create a unique and distinct standard for safety symbols.

As of September 2022, the latest version is ISO 7010:2019, with 11 published amendments. This revision canceled and replaced ISO 20712-1:2008, incorporating the water safety signs and beach safety flags specified in it.

== Shape and colour ==
ISO 7010 specifies five combinations of shape and colour to distinguish between the type of information presented.

Shape and colour of sign types
Sign type	Meaning	Colour (per ISO 3864-4)	Shape	Example
Prohibition sign	Must not do	Red	Circle with diagonal line	No open flame
Mandatory sign	Must do	Blue	Circle	Use hearing protection
Warning sign	Warn of hazard	Yellow	Equilateral triangle with rounded corners	Explosive materials
Safe condition sign	Identifying of safety equipment and exits	Green	Square or rectangular	Emergency assembly point
Fire safety sign	Identifying of firefighting equipment	Red	Square	Fire extinguisher

== List ==
ISO registers and lists recommended pictograms, which it calls "safety signs", on its website, ISO.org. The ISO standard provides a registered number for pictograms that have officially been made part of the ISO 7010 standard. Corresponding with the categories above, in ISO parlance, "E" numbers refer to Emergency (signs showing a safe condition), "F" numbers refer to Fire protection, "P" numbers refer to Prohibited actions, "M" numbers refer to Mandatory actions, and "W" numbers refer to Warnings of hazards.

According to the related ISO 3864-1 standard, if a symbol does not exist for a situation, the recommended solution is to use the relevant 'general' symbol (M001, P001, W001), along with a supplemental text message.

=== Safe condition ===
E001 – Emergency exit (left hand)

E002 – Emergency exit (right hand)

E003 – First aid

E004 – Emergency telephone

E007 – Evacuation assembly point

E008 – Break to obtain access

E009 – Doctor

E010 – Automated external heart defibrillator

E011 – Eyewash station

E012 – Safety shower

E013 – Stretcher

E014 – Child seat presence and orientation detection system (CPOD)

E015 – Drinking water

E016 – Emergency window with escape ladder

E017 – Rescue window

E018 – Turn anticlockwise to open

E019 – Turn clockwise to open

E020 – Emergency stop button

E021 – Protection shelter

E022 – Door opens by pushing on the left-hand side

E023 – Door opens by pushing on the right-hand side

E024 – Evacuation temporary refuge

E025 – Emergency hammer

E026 – Emergency exit for people unable to walk or with walking impairment (left)

E027 – Medical grab bag

E028 – Oxygen resuscitator

E029 – Emergency escape breathing device

E030 – Emergency exit for people unable to walk or with walking impairment (right)

E031 – Shipboard general alarm

E032 – Shipboard assembly station

E033 – Door slides right to open

E034 – Door slides left to open

E035 – Liferaft knife

E036 – Lifeboat

E037 – Rescue boat

E038 – Liferaft

E039 – Davit-launched liferaft

E040 – Lifebuoy

E041 – Lifebuoy with line

E042 – Lifebuoy with light

E043 – Lifebuoy with line and light

E044 – Lifejacket

E045 – Child's lifejacket

E046 – Infant's lifejacket

E047 – Search and rescue transponder

E048 – Survival craft distress signals

E049 – Rocket parachute flare

E050 – Line-throwing appliance

E051 – Two-way VHF radiotelephone apparatus

E052 – Emergency position indicating radio beacon

E053 – Embarkment ladder

E054 – Marine evacuation slide

E055 – Marine evacuation chute

E056 – Survival clothing

E057 – Door opens by pulling on the left-hand side

E058 – Door opens by pulling on the right-hand side

E059 – Escape ladder

E060 – Evacuation chair

E061 – Water life-saving equipment

E062 – Tsunami evacuation area

E063 – Tsunami evacuation building

E064 – First aid responder

E065 – Natural disaster outdoor refuge area

E067 – Evacuation mattress

E068 – Lifebuoy with light and smoke

E069 – Person overboard call point

E070 – Evacuation lift for people unable to use stairs

E071 – Rescue toboggan

E072 – Safe anchorage point

E073 – Emergency descent device

E074 – Emergency rations

E075 – Lifeguard

E076 – Evacuation equipment

==== Crescent variant ====
ISO 7010 states on all symbols with a first aid cross that it "may be replaced with another element appropriate to cultural requirements". In some countries with a Muslim-majority population, an appropriate symbol is the crescent.

=== Fire protection ===
F001 – Fire extinguisher

F002 – Fire hose reel

F003 – Fire ladder

F004 – Collection of firefighting equipment

F005 – Fire alarm call point

F006 – Fire emergency telephone

F007 – Fire protection door

F008 – Fixed fire extinguishing battery

F009 – Wheeled fire extinguisher

F010 – Portable foam applicator unit

F011 – Water fog applicator

F012 – Fixed fire extinguishing installation

F013 – Fixed fire extinguishing bottle

F014 – Remote release station

F015 – Fire monitor

F016 – Fire blanket

F017 – Firefighters' lift

F018 – Fire alarm flashing light

F019 – Unconnected fire hose

=== Mandatory ===
M001 – General mandatory action sign

M002 – Refer to instruction manual/booklet

M003 – Wear ear protection

M004 – Wear eye protection

M005 – Connect an earth terminal to the ground

M006 – Disconnect mains plug from electrical outlet

M007 – Opaque eye protection must be worn

M008 – Wear safety footwear

M009 – Wear protective gloves

M010 – Wear protective clothing

M011 – Wash your hands

M012 – Use handrail

M013 – Wear a face shield

M014 – Wear head protection

M015 – Wear high-visibility clothing

M016 – Wear a mask

M017 – Wear respiratory protection

M018 – Wear a safety harness

M019 – Wear a welding mask

M020 – Wear safety belts

M021 – Disconnect before carrying out maintenance or repair

M022 – Use barrier cream

M023 – Use footbridge

M024 – Use this walkway

M025 – Protect infants' eyes with opaque eye protection

M026 – Use protective apron

M027 — Check guard

M028 — Keep locked

M029 — Sound horn

M030 — Use litter bin

M031 — Use table saw adjustable guard

M032 — Wear anti-static footwear

M033 — Close safety bar of chairlift

M034 — Open safety bar of chairlift

M035 — Immediately leave the tow-track in the event of falling

M036 — Lift ski tips

M037 — Close and secure hatches in launch sequence

M038 — Start engine in launch sequence

M039 — Lower lifeboat to the water in launch sequence

M040 — Lower liferaft to the water in launch sequence

M041 — Lower rescue boat to the water in launch sequence

M042 — Release falls in launch sequence

M043 — Start water spray in launch sequence

M044 — Start air supply in launch sequence

M045 — Release lifeboat gripes in launch sequence

M046 — Secure gas cylinders

M047 — Use self-contained breathing appliance

M048 — Use gas detector

M049 — Wear protective roller sport equipment

M050 — Alighting from toboggan to the left

M051 — Alighting from toboggan to the right

M052 — Keep distance between toboggans

M053 — Wear personal flotation devices

M054 — Keep children under supervision in the aquatic environment

M055 – Keep out of the reach of children

M056 – Ventilate before and during entering

M057 – Ensure continuous ventilation

M058 – Entry only with supervisor outside

M059 – Wear laboratory coat

M060 – Hold the trolley handle

M061 – Disinfect your hands

M062 – Disinfect surface

M063 – Remove ski pole strap from wrist

M064 – Hold two ski poles with a single hand

M065 – Children must be accompanied

M066 – Wear a sports helmet

M067 – Wear snow goggles

M068 – Lock moving mechanical parts

M069 – Tools must be tethered

M070 – Use lamp in luminaire with shield

M071 – Use anti-tip restraints

M072 – Use decontamination shower

=== Prohibition ===
P001 – General prohibition sign

P002 – No smoking

P003 – No open flame; Fire, open ignition source and smoking prohibited

P004 – No thoroughfare

P005 – Not drinking water

P006 – No access for forklift trucks and industrial vehicles

P007 – No access for people with active implanted cardiac devices

P008 – No metallic articles or watches

P009 – No climbing

P010 – Do not touch

P011 – Do not extinguish with water

P012 – No heavy load

P013 – No activated mobile phone

P014 – No access for people with metallic implants

P015 – No reaching in

P016 – Do not spray with water

P017 – No pushing

P018 – No sitting

P019 – No stepping on surface

P020 – Do not use lift in the event of fire

P021 – No dogs

P022 – No eating or drinking

P023 – Do not obstruct

P024 – Do not walk or stand here

P025 – Do not use this incomplete scaffold

P026 – Do not use this device in a bathtub, shower or water-filled reservoir

P027 – Do not use this lift for people

P028 – Do not wear gloves

P029 – No photography

P030 – Do not tie knots in rope

P031 – Do not alter the state of the switch

P032 – Do not use for face grinding

P033 – Do not use for wet grinding

P034 – Do not use with hand-held grinder

P035 – Do not wear metal-studded footwear

P036 – No children allowed

P037 – Do not leave the tow-track

P038 – Do not swing the chair

P039 – Hot works prohibited

P040 – Do not set off fireworks

P041 – No leaning against

P042 – Not for pregnant women

P043 – Not for people in the state of intoxication

P044 – Use of smart glasses prohibited

P045 – No campfire

P046 – Do not stretch out of toboggan

P047 – Do not ram into toboggans

P048 – No running

P049 – No swimming

P050 – No snorkelling

P051 – No sub-aqua diving

P052 – No diving

P053 – No sailing

P054 – No windsurfing

P055 – No manually powered craft

P056 – No mechanically powered craft

P057 – No personal water craft

P058 – No towed water activity

P059 – No surf craft

P060 – No outdoor footwear

P061 – No jumping into water

P062 – No pushing into water

P063 – No body boarding

P064 – No surfing between the red-and-yellow flags

P065 – No kite surfing

P066 – No parasailing

P067 – No sand yachting

P068 – Do not expose to direct sunlight or hot surface

P069 – Not to be serviced by users

P070 – Do not put finger into the nozzle of a hydromassage

P071 – Do not cross barrier

P072 – No jumping down

P073 – Do not shut lid when burners are operating

P074 – Child seat installation prohibited

P075 – Do not stare at light source

P076 – No skiing

P077 – No snowboarding

P078 – No tobogganing or sledding

P079 – No ice skating

P080 – No access for unauthorized persons

P081 – Do not cover appliance

=== Warning ===
W001 – General warning sign

W002 – Explosive material

W003 – Radioactive material or ionizing radiation

W004 – Laser beam

W005 – Non-ionizing radiation

W006 – Magnetic field

W007 – Floor-level obstacle

W008 – Drop (fall)

W009 – Biological hazard

W010 – Low temperature/freezing conditions

W011 – Slippery surface

W012 – Electricity

W013 – Guard dog

W014 – Forklift trucks and other industrial vehicles

W015 – Overhead load

W016 – Toxic material

W017 – Hot surface

W018 – Automatic start-up

W019 – Crushing

W020 – Overhead obstacle

W021 – Flammable material

W022 – Sharp element

W023 – Corrosive substance

W024 – Crushing of hands

W025 – Counterrotating rollers

W026 – Battery charging

W027 – Optical radiation

W028 – Oxidizing substance

W029 – Pressurized cylinder

W030 – Hand crushing between press brake tool

W031 – Hand crushing between press brake and material

W032 — Rapid movement of workpiece in press brake

W033 — Barbed wire

W034 — Bull

W035 – Falling objects

W036 — Fragile roof

W037 — Run over by remote operator controlled machine

W038 — Sudden loud noise

W039 – Falling ice

W040 — Roof avalanche

W041 — Asphyxiating atmosphere

W042 — Arc flash

W043 — Thin ice

W044 — Slipway

W045 — Towed water activity area

W046 — Surf craft area

W047 — Deep water

W048 — Shallow water (diving)

W049 — Submerged objects

W050 — Sudden drop in swimming or leisure pools

W051 — Unprotected edge

W052 — Unstable cliff edge

W053 — Unstable cliff

W054 — Shark

W055 — Sewage effluent outfall

W056 — Tsunami hazard zone

W057 — Strong currents

W058 — Boating area

W059 — Sand yachting

W060 — Incoming tides

W061 — Quicksand or mud/deep mud or silt

W062 — Kite surfing

W063 — Parasailing

W064 — Strong winds

W065 — High surf or large breaking waves

W066 — Deep shelving beach

W067 — Crocodiles, alligators or caymans

W068 – Falling into water when stepping on or off a floating surface

W069 – Jellyfish

W070 – Step down

W071 – Substance or mixture presenting a health hazard

W072 – Substance or mixture that can cause an environmental hazard

W073 – Large-scale fire zone

W074 – Tornado zone

W075 – Active volcano zone

W076 – Debris flow zone

W077 – Flood zone

W078 – Landslide zone

W079 – Hot content

W080 – Hot steam

W082 – Crevasses under snow

W083 – Avalanche

W084 – Thunderstorm

W085 – Typhoon/hurricane/cyclone zone

W087 – High sound volume levels

W088 – Moving blades

W089 – Moving gears

=== Withdrawn symbols ===
The following symbols were previously part of ISO 7010, but have since been withdrawn from the standard; arrow type D in ISO standard 3864-3 are to be used in their stead.

E005 – Direction, arrow (90° increments), safe condition

E006 – Direction, 45° arrow (90° increments), safe condition

== Regional variants ==
=== France ===
NF ISO 7010 Collection of firefighting equipment

=== Netherlands ===
NEN 3011 – Fire hose with loose nozzle

NEN 3011 – Hydrant with Storz

NEN 3011 – Underground fire hydrant

NEN 3011 – Collection of emergency response resources

NEN 3011 – Authorized access only

NEN 3011 – Closing the fire door is mandatory

NEN 3011 – Keep the emergency door clear

== See also ==
- Hazard symbol
- ISO 3864 – Safety colors and safety signs
- ISO 7001 – Public Information Symbols
- ISO 21482 – A separate standard for a specific radiation safety sign for specific applications
- Pipe marking § ISO 20560-1 & -2 Safety information for piping systems
- ANSI Z535 – The United States national standard for safety information
- Directive 92/58/EEC – Safety signs used in the European Union
- GHS hazard pictograms – Symbols used by the Globally Harmonized System of Classification and Labelling of Chemicals
