= ISO 3864 =

Technical standard for safety symbols

ISO 3864:2011
- Graphical symbols — Safety colours and safety signs
- Example safety sign designed according to ISO 3864-1
- Abbreviation: ISO 3864
- Year started: March 1984
- First published: March 1984; 42 years ago
- Latest version: 2; 2011
- Organization: International Organization for Standardization
- Committee: ISO/TC 145/SC 2 Safety identification, signs, shapes, symbols and colours
- Domain: Safety signage design
- Website: www.iso.org/standard/51021.html

ISO 3864 is an International Organization for Standardization technical standard for safety signs and markings in workplaces and public facilities. These labels are graphical, to overcome language barriers. The standard is split into four parts.

== Parts ==
ISO 3864 consists of four parts, that provide more specific and situation specific guidance depending on the application.

- ISO 3864-1:2011 Part 1: Design principles for safety signs and safety markings
- ISO 3864-2:2016 Part 2: Design principles for product safety labels
- ISO 3864-3:2012 Part 3: Design principles for graphical symbols for use in safety signs
- ISO 3864-4:2011 Part 4: Colorimetric and photometric properties of safety sign materials

Part 1 explains how to layout the components of safety signage, dictate the color scheme and sizing information. Part 2 covers the same concepts as part one, but specifically for labels applied on machinery, vehicles and consumer goods. Part 3 contains guidance for designing new safety symbols. Part 4 specifies the standards for phosphorescent material and colours of a sign, as well as testing to confirm these signs meets required standards.

== Components of ISO 3864 ==
=== Colours ===
These are the colours specified in ISO Standard 3864-4 in RAL colour standard.

Meaning	RAL Name	RAL Number	CMYK	RGB Hex	Example of Colour
Warning	Signal Yellow	1003	5, 20, 90, 0	#F3AD1E	
Prohibition/Fire Equipment	Signal Red	3001	20, 100, 90, 10	#9E3C3C	
Mandatory	Signal Blue	5005	100, 40, 0, 40	#215E8F	
Safe Condition	Signal Green	6032	90, 10, 80, 0	#31865C	
Backgrounds and Symbol	Signal White	9003	0, 0, 0, 0	#EBEEEC	
Symbol	Signal Black	9004	100, 90, 100, 80	#414446	

In addition, ISO standard 3864-2:2016 lays out the following colours that correspond to levels of risk. This standard adds "Orange" as an incremental colour to the pallette above.

Meaning	Signal word	Background colour of panel	Contrast colour	Definition	RGB Hex	Example of Colour
Low level of risk	CAUTION	Yellow	Black	RAL 1003 (per ISO 3864-4)	#F9A900	
Medium level of risk	WARNING	Orange	Black	RAL 2010, Munsell 2,5YR6/14G, or Munsell 5YR6/15G	#D05D29	
High level of risk	DANGER	Red	White	RAL 3001 (per ISO 3864-4)	#9B2423	

=== Arrows ===
ISO 3864-3 defines four types of arrow designs, and specifies what situations each type should be used in.

Arrow Type	Arrow image	Meaning	Arrowhead angle in degrees
A		General movement of objects	60°
B		Direction of rotation	60°
C		Movement of forces; pressures, fluids, gasses	84°
D		Movement of people	84° – 86°

=== Safety markings ===
Part 1 also provides design standards for 'safety markings', which are safety colors combined with a contrasting color in an alternating 45° stripe pattern, intended to increase the visibility of an object, location or safety message.

Marking	Colours	Meaning
borderless	Yellow/Black	Indicate location of a hazard
borderless	Red/White	Indicate location of firefighting equipment or a prohibition.
borderless	Blue/White	Mandatory Action
borderless	Green/White	Safe condition

=== Signage design ===
In addition to prescribing colours for safety signage, ISO 3864 also specifies how to layout the elements of the sign: A symbol and optional 'supplemental sign' which contains the supplementary text message.

Examples of ISO 3864 sign layouts

A 'mandatory' sign, in a vertical format.

A 'mandatory' sign, in a horizontal format, with the text box to the right of the symbol.

A 'fire protection' sign, in a vertical format.

A 'fire protection' sign, in horizontal format, with the text box to the right of the symbol.

==== Multi-message signs ====
For situations where more than one message needs to be communicated (Note: For example, a hazard message: "Acid" and mandatory message "Wear Gloves".), ISO 3864 also provides guidance for "multiple signs", which consist of two or more symbol and text messages combined into a single sign. Additionally, fire protection and safe condition signs, which mark the location of equipment or exits can be combined with an arrow to indicate the direction to the item depicted on the sign.

Examples of ISO 3864 'multiple signs' layouts

A multi-message sign for hazard and mandatory action, in a vertical format

A multi-message sign, with hazard, prohibition and mandatory action, in a horizontal format.

An exit symbol, combined with an arrow pointed up, to the left.

A fire extinguisher sign, combined with an arrow to the right.

== Related standards ==
The corresponding American standard is ANSI Z535. ANSI Z535.1 also explicitly uses multiple levels of hazard, including Yellow (Pantone 109) for 'caution' messages, and Orange (Pantone 151) for stronger 'warning' messages. Like ISO 3864, ANSI Z535 includes multiple sections: ANSI Z535.6-2006 defines an optional accompanying text in one or more languages.

ISO 3864 is extended by ISO 7010, which provides a set of symbols based on the principles and properties specified in ISO 3864.

== See also ==
- ANSI Z535 – American technical standard for presenting safety and accident prevention information
- Directive 92/58/EEC – European Directive harmonizing safety signs
- Hazard symbol – Warning symbol on locations or products
- ISO 7010 – Technical standard for safety symbols
- Safety sign – Type of sign
