= Precautionary statement =

Text warning individuals

In United States safety standards, precautionary statements are sentences providing information on potential hazards and proper procedures. They are used in situations from consumer product on labels and manuals to descriptions of physical activities. Various methods are used to bring focus to them, such as setting apart from normal text, graphic icons, changes in text's font and color. Texts will often clarify the types of statements and their meanings within the text. Common precautionary statements are described below.

== Danger ==
Danger statements are a description of situations where an immediate hazard will cause death or serious injury to workers and/or the general public if not avoided. This designation is to be used only in extreme situations.

OSHA/ANSI Z35.1	ANSI Z535	Intended Use
		Situation will result in serious injury or death.

ANSI Z535.5 Definition: "Indicates a hazardous situation that, if not avoided, will result in death or serious injury. The signal word "DANGER" is to be limited to the most extreme situations. DANGER [signs] should not be used for property damage hazards unless personal injury risk appropriate to these levels is also involved."

OSHA 1910.145 Definition: "Shall be used in major hazard situations where an immediate hazard presents a threat of death or serious injury to employees. Danger tags shall be used only in these situations."

== Warning ==
Warning statements are a description of a situation where a potentially hazardous condition exists that could result in the death or serious injury of workers and/or the general public if not avoided.

OSHA/ANSI Z535.2 (Note: The warning header and signal word were not part of ANSI Z35, and does not appear in 1919.145 regarding signs. This design appears in ANSI Z535.2-1991 & 1998, before being phased out.)	ANSI Z535	Intended Use
		Situation could result in serious injury or death.

ANSI Z535.5 Definition: "Indicates a hazardous situation that, if not avoided, could result in death or serious injury. WARNING [signs] should not be used for property damage hazards unless personal injury risk appropriate to this level is also involved."

OSHA 1910.145 Definition: "May be used to represent a hazard level between "Caution" and "Danger," instead of the required "Caution" tag, provided that they have a signal word of "Warning," an appropriate major message, and otherwise meet the general tag criteria of paragraph (f)(4) of this section."

== Caution ==
Caution statements are a description of situations where a non-immediate or potential hazard presents a lesser threat of injury that could result in minor or moderate injuries to workers and/or the general public.

OSHA/ANSI Z35.1	ANSI Z535	Intended Use
		Situation could result moderate or minor injury.

ANSI Z535.5 Definition: "Indicates a hazardous situation that, if not avoided, could result in minor or moderate injury."

OSHA 1910.145 Definition: "Shall be used in minor hazard situations where a non-immediate or potential hazard or unsafe practice presents a lesser threat of employee injury."

== Notice ==
Notice statements are a description of situations where a non-immediate or potential hazard presents a risk to damage of property and equipment. May be used to indicate important operational characteristics. There is no "Safety Alert" or attention symbol present in this situation.

ANSI Z35.1	ANSI Z535	Intended Use
		Situations that at worst will only result in property damage and will not result in physical injuries.

ANSI Z535.5 Definition: "Indicates information considered important but not hazard related. The safety alert symbol (a triangle with the exclamation point) shall not be used with this signal word. For environmental/facility signs, NOTICE is typically the choice of signal word for messages relating to property damage, security, sanitation, and housekeeping rules."

OSHA 1910.145 Definition: None.

== See also ==
- ANSI Z535 - An American safety sign standard that makes heavy use of precautionary statements in the form of a 'header'.
- Safety sign
