= ANSI Z535 =

American technical standard for presenting safety and accident prevention information

- Z535 Safety Alerting Standards
- Example ANSI Z535 safety signs, for high voltage and Biohazard.
- Abbreviation: ANSI Z535, Z535
- Year started: September 1987
- First published: June 1991; 35 years ago
- Latest version: 6; 2022
- Organization: American National Standards Institute
- Committee: Z535 Committee
- Related standards: Previous Standards: Z35; Z53
- Domain: Safety signage design
- Website: webstore.ansi.org/standards/nema/ansiz5352022-2475871

ANSI Z535 are American-developed standards designed to improve the identification of potential hazards to workers and/or property. The identifications are called Hazardous Communication (HazCom). ANSI Z535 establishes the design and application standards for all HazCom used across North America and meets many other global standards used by industrialized nations. ANSI Z535 standards integrate with international ISO 3864 standards, ensuring the widest compliance, globally, with export/import laws. ANSI Z535 standardized HazCom may appear on workplace walls, industrial machines, at industrial access points, on electrical controls, inside product user guides, and on export documentation.

== Sub-Standards ==
ANSI Z535 standards are described in the following individual instruction books for six specific HazCom categories:

- ANSI Z535.1 American National Standard for Safety Colors
- ANSI Z535.2 American National Standard for Environmental and Facility Safety Signs
- ANSI Z535.3 American National Standard for Criteria for Safety Symbols
- ANSI Z535.4 American National Standard for Product Safety Signs and Labels
- ANSI Z535.5 American National Standard for Safety Tags and Barricade Tapes (for Temporary Hazards)
- ANSI Z535.6 American National Standard for Product Safety Information in Product Manuals, Instructions (technical writing), and Other Collateral Materials

== Regulation ==
American National Standards Institute (ANSI) and the Occupational Safety and Health Administration (OSHA) work side-by-side to manage Hazardous Communications (HazCom) in all American workplaces. Outside the US, the International Organization for Standardization (ISO) for international HazCom works closely with ANSI to ensure overlapping standards offer proper integration. While ANSI manages HazCom design and application standards, OSHA sets federal laws and provides states and local governments with standards they use to establish laws and regulatory codes within their own jurisdictions. The Occupational Safety and Health (OSH) Act of 1970 is one of the most important of all HazCom federal laws because it clearly states the employer's legal responsibility:

"Each employer shall furnish to each of his employees' employment and a place of employment which are free from recognized hazards that are causing or are likely to cause death or serious physical harm to his employees."

Shortly after the OSH Act of 1970 was passed into law, OSHA updated its HazCom standards with the passage of OSHA Standard 1910.145. This standard was one of the first to clarify design, application and use of HazCom signs and symbols. These newer standards also helped define specific hazards that could harm workers, the public, or both and/or cause damage to property. OSHA Standard 1910.145 covers all safety signs except those designed for streets, highways and railroads.

With the passage of OSHA Standard 1910.145, the administration also began referencing ANSI HazCom design and application standards instead of creating its own (see example below):

"Fundamental Specification of Safety Colors for CIE Standard Source 'C,' " of ANSI Z53.1-1967 or in Table 1, "Specification of the Safety Colors for CIE Illuminate C and the CIE 1931, 2° Standard Observer," of ANSI Z535.1-2006(R2011), incorporated by reference in § 1910.6."

Today, ANSI Z53.1-1967 and ANSI Z35.1-1968 are known as ANSI Z535.1, Z535.2, Z535.3, Z535.4, Z535.5 and Z535.6. These standards (books) offer more specific HazCom guidance for employers designing workplaces, manufacturers providing products to the workplace, as well as employers documenting workplace procedures, and manufacturers documenting product manuals. ANSI's Z535 signal words and associated design standards are crafted to interface seamlessly with the International Organization for Standardization (ISO) - making ANSI's DANGER, WARNING, CAUTION and NOTICE standards the most widely used and accepted in the world. However, these newer ANSI standards are not yet referenced by OSHA and not legally binding. According to OSHA, the newer ANSI standards will fulfill OSHA's HazCom requirements when substituted in place of the older ANSI Z53.1-1967 and ANSI Z35.1-1968.

"OSHA will continue to reference the ANSI Z35.1-68 and ANSI Z53.1-67 standards when enforcing workplace safety. Employers are allowed, however, to comply with the most current consensus standards applicable to their operations, rather than with the OSHA standard in effect at the time of inspection, when the employer's action provides equal or greater employee protection. So long as the standards used by the employer provide such protection, a violation where the employer is not in compliance with OSHA's standards but is in compliance with the new standards may be considered de minimis and not be cited."

Although OSHA does not legally require or may not always reference ANSI's newest HazCom standards, proper use of the latest ANSI Z535 standards offers employers and manufacturers many advantages.

- ANSI Z535 is a legal substitute for the older ANSI standards OSHA does require,
- ANSI Z535's safety signal words and related designs are the most globally accepted HazCom and generally preferred globally over ISO alternatives,
- ANSI Z535 offers the greatest level of protection against HazCom liability suits and offers the broadest level of acceptance internationally when ANSI's ISO integrations are properly followed,
- OSHA relies, exclusively, on ANSI to establish all new HazCom design standards for the administration's own standards and federal regulations.

In a 2013 public letter to NEMA/ANSI, OSHA says it is actively working to incorporate ANSI's latest Z535 standards into its HazCom design references.

== Development ==
The ANSI Z535 standards are administered and published by the National Electrical Manufacturers Association (NEMA), an association of member companies that manufacture a diverse set of products including power transmission and distribution equipment, lighting systems, factory automation and control systems, and medical diagnostic imaging systems. NEMA is headquartered in Arlington, Virginia.

These standards have been developed and formulated by the ANSI Z535 committee, originally formed in 1979 and accredited by the American National Standards Institute. This committee is a highly active United States standards-making body that writes these standards to govern the characteristics of visual safety markings that are used to warn about hazards and prevent accidents. Many developed countries throughout the world, including those following ISO standards, adopt or use a variation of ANSI's signal word standards for safety HazCom.

As of 2020, the chair of the committee is Steven M. Hall, Senior Consultant, Applied Safety + Ergonomics in Ann Arbor, Michigan. Previously, the chairmanship was held by Geoffrey Peckham, CEO of Clarion Safety Systems from 2012 to 2020, succeeding Gary Bell who held the chair for more than two decades.

The ANSI Z535 standard series is continually improved and refined based on human factors, research, and court case precedents. These standards are formally revised every five years, with the most recent publication in October 2017.

== Usage ==
ANSI Z535-style communications are becoming more prevalent in society. Identified by their use of the signal words "DANGER", "WARNING", "CAUTION", "NOTICE", or "SAFETY INSTRUCTIONS", ANSI-style signs most often include specific details about the nature of the hazard, the consequence of interaction with the hazard, and avoidance procedures. Product manufacturers and facility owners in a wide array of industries use the ANSI Z535 standards in their efforts to ensure a safer workplace and the safe use of their products so both accidents and lawsuits are minimized.

ANSI Z535 signal word applications and common colors (some color variations allowed for improved visibility. Follow color variation standards described by ANSI Z535):

- DANGER! Is only used to identify a hazard that "will" cause death (White w/red background).
- WARNING! Is only used to identify a hazard that "may" cause death and will cause injury (Black w/orange background).
- CAUTION! Is only used to identify a hazard that may or will cause injury but not death (Black w/yellow background).
- NOTICE Is only used to identify safety-related, non-hazards, such as PPE reminders or possible property damage (White/blue background).

Safety colors provided by ANSI Z535 are harmonized with U.S. Federal Regulations, and include tolerances ranges to make them compatible with ISO 3864. However, ANSI safety colors are not exactly the same colors as used in U.S. traffic signs prescribed by the Manual on Uniform Traffic Control Devices (MUTCD).

ANSI Z535.1-2017 Safety Colors (PMS, Munsell and HEX Code)

The ANSI Z535 standards are often cited in U.S. court decisions as the state-of-the-art benchmark against which safety markings and their adequacy are judged.

== See also ==
- ANSI Z35 — Predecessor American safety sign standard in use from 1941 to 1991
- ISO 3864 — International equivalent to this American National Standard, for information signs, colors and warnings
- ISO 7010 — International equivalent to this American National Standard, for shapes and symbols
