= Barricade tape =

Security item to mark hazardous areas

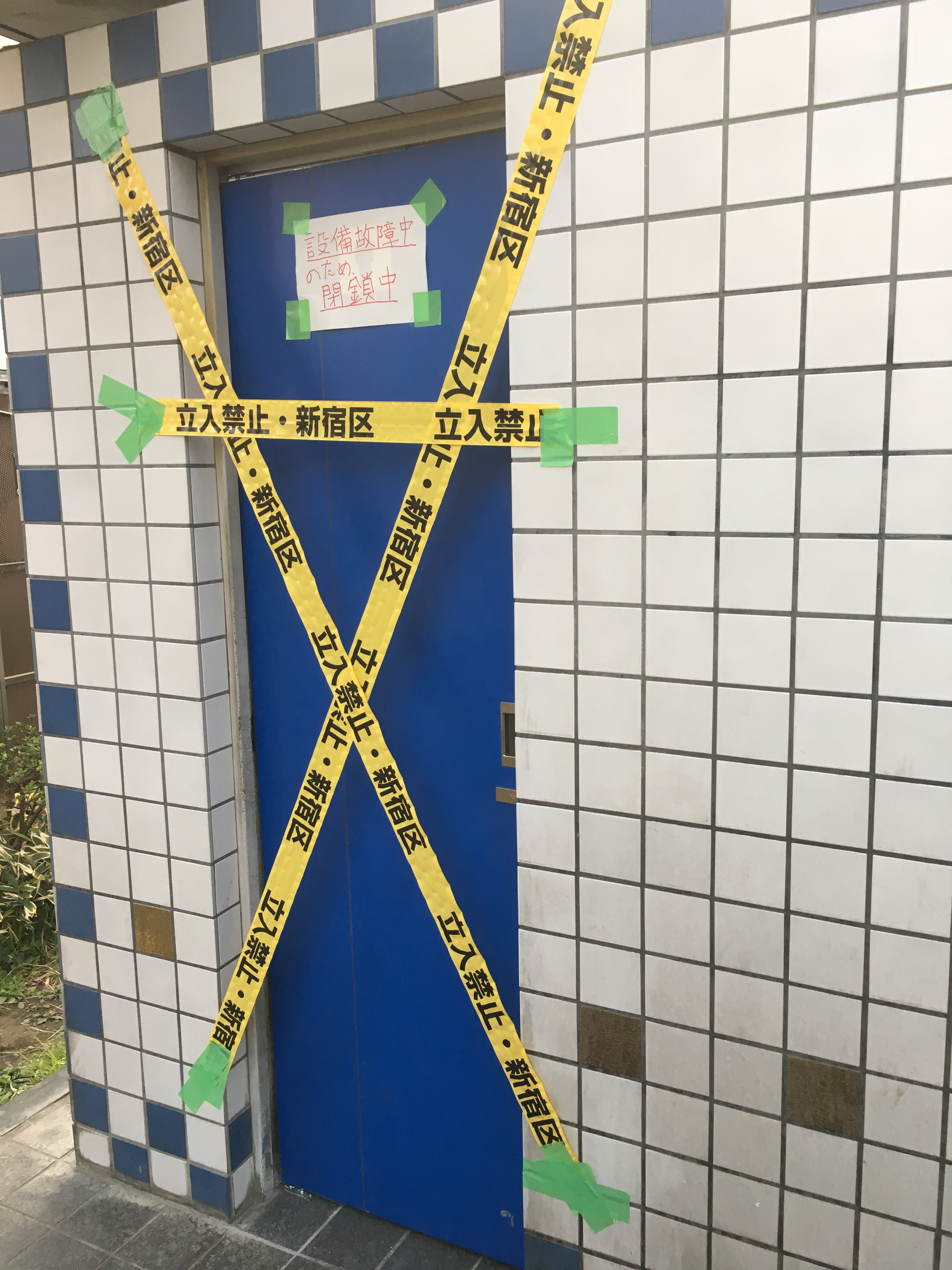
Barricade tape across a door in Japan

Barricade tape is brightly colored tape (often incorporating a two-tone pattern of alternating yellow-black or red-white stripes or the words "Caution" or "Danger" in prominent lettering) that is used to warn or catch the attention of passersby of an area or situation containing a possible hazard. It acts as a minor impediment to prevent accidental entrance to that area or situation and as a result enhances general safety. Barricade tape is also known as construction tape or barrier tape, or in reference to the safety hazard involved as caution tape, warning tape, danger tape or hazard tape. When used by police, the tape is named police tape.

The tape is often wrapped and affixed as a visual warning sign and demarcation, for instance against entering a dangerous area, such as an industrial or commercial building site, a roadworks construction site or the scene of an accident or a crime (for crime scene preservation), or against handling inoperative machinery or appliances.

== Description ==
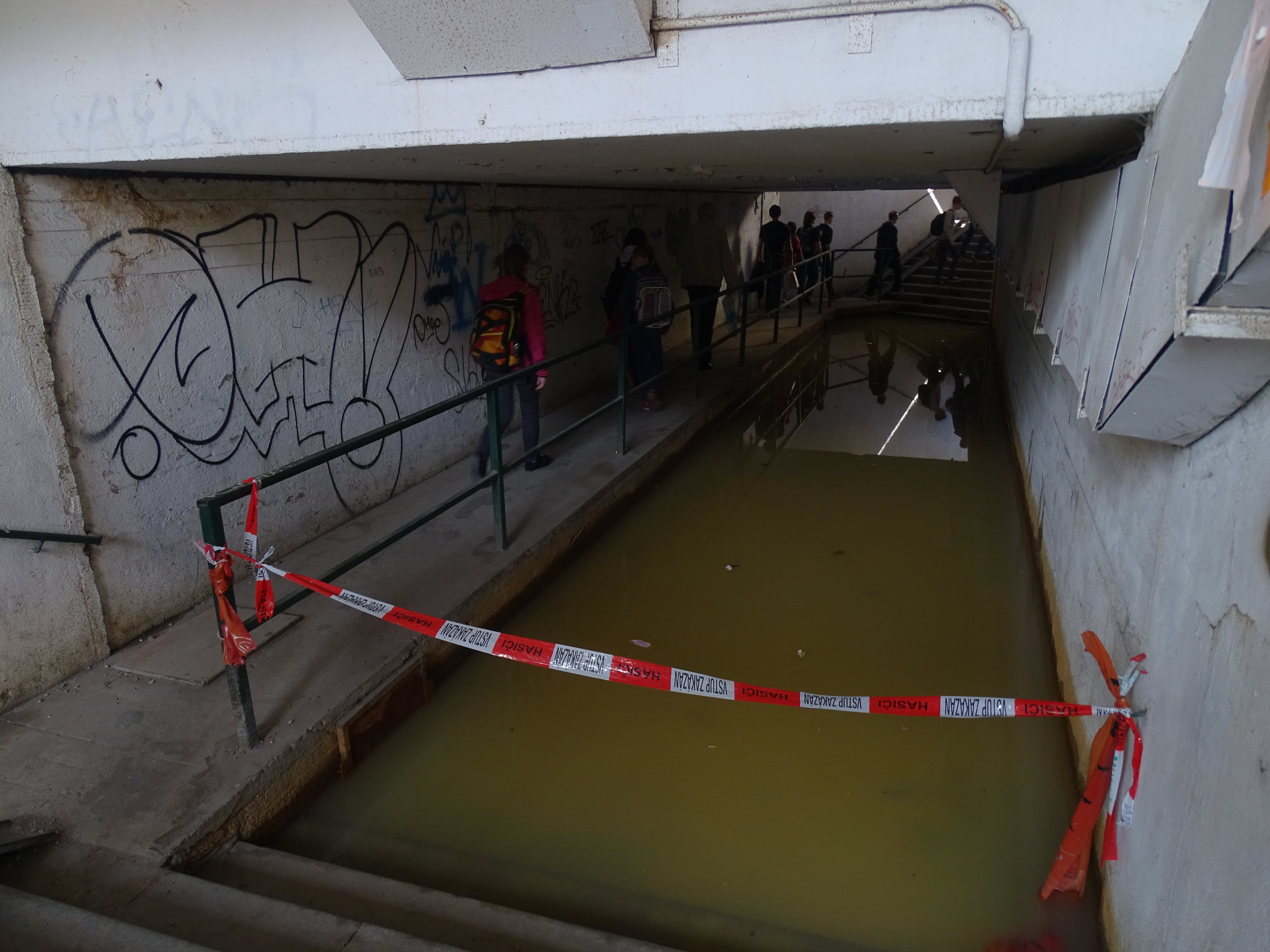
Red-and-white warning tape marking off an unsafe route

Barricade tape is made with durable, resilient, tear-proof plastic materials such as polyethylene, polypropylene, or nylon. Different manufacturers offer different sizes and thicknesses of barricade tape. Barricade tape often has a bright background and pre-printed bold warning text usually has a bright yellow color in the back. It is also possible to purchase plain barricade tape and write a custom message on it. However, care should be taken when using custom tape, as barricade tape designs may be required to comply with regulations, such as the Occupational Safety and Health Administration (OSHA) and American National Standards Institute (ANSI) regulations (when used for purposes subject to regulation by these organizations) in the USA.

== Types ==
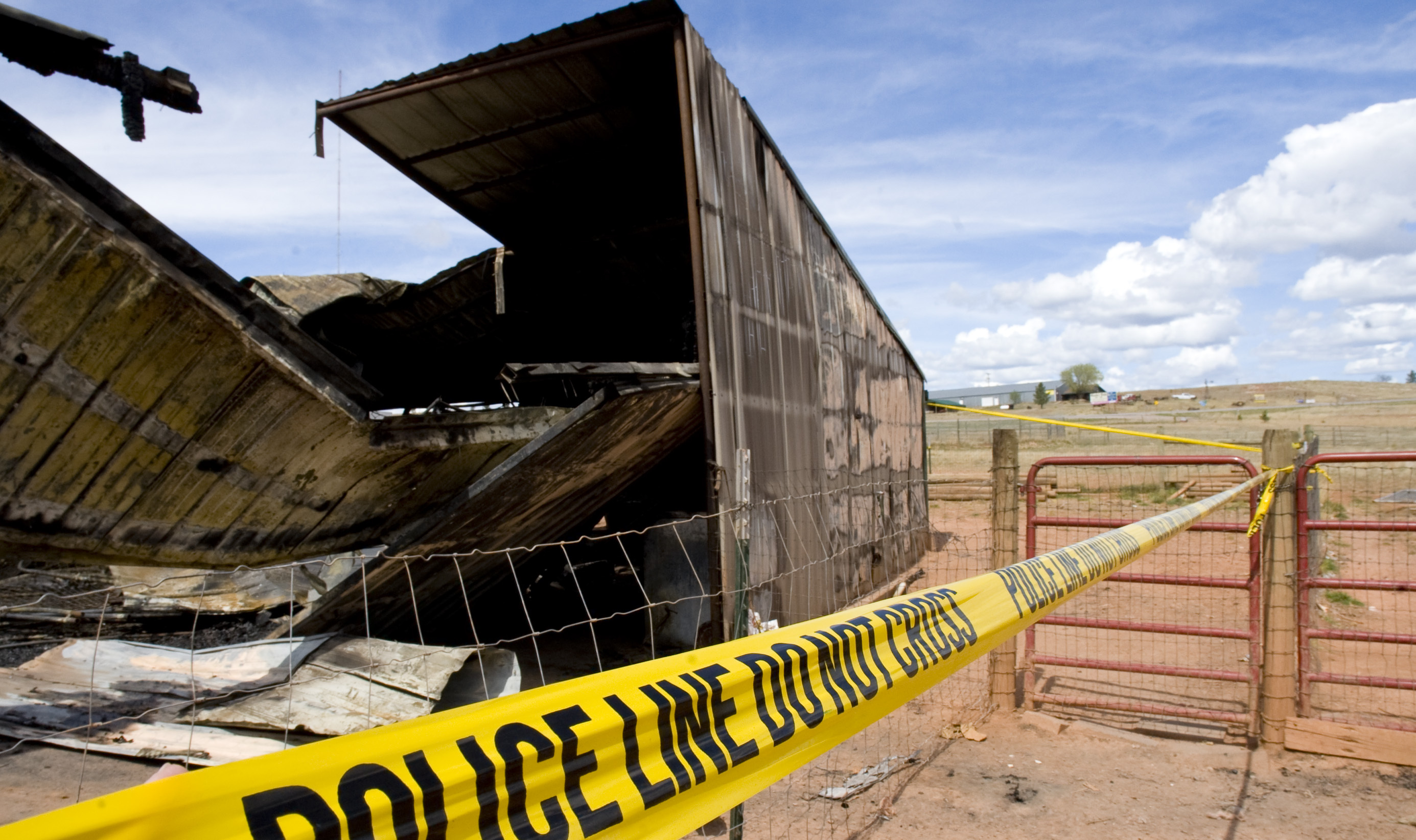
Police tape marking off a crime scene

Barricade tape is used according to the color specifications set by OSHA and ANSI. Barricade tape may be used primarily as a safety precaution for various industries and procedures.

Construction tape
This is used in construction zones to notify people about ongoing construction and that there are possible hazards within the demarcated area. Construction tape usually employs a yellow-black color combination and incorporates printed text, such as "Under Construction", "Caution", "Work Zone", and "Keep Out" (among others). This type of barrier tape is commonly found at the site of renovations, demolition, and minor repairs.
Hazard tape
This is used in locations containing a substantial danger. Examples include electrocution hazards or areas within which there is a risk of exposure to toxic chemicals. In some regions, the specific color combination indicates the type of threat. For example, yellow-black tape may be used to signal the presence of a physical hazard (e.g., a hole), while magenta-yellow can denote a radiation hazard. This type of barrier tape is commonly used in laboratories, production areas, and industrial zones.
Traffic control device tape
This type of barrier tape, as its name implies is used to control traffic, whether foot traffic or vehicle traffic. Traffic control device tapes are used as temporary traffic signal to redirect traffic during parade or whenever a road is closed. These are usually brightly colored, either in solid orange or orange-white combination.
Police tape or law enforcement tape
This type of barrier tape is used to isolate, protect and preserve a crime scene. Police tape is used to notify the public that an investigation is ongoing and that a particular area is restricted. This is usually seen with a yellow-white, yellow-black or blue-white color combination, and usually say "POLICE LINE DO NOT CROSS" or "CRIME SCENE DO NOT CROSS".
Firefighter tape
This serves the same purpose as police tape and hazard tape. Firefighter tape is used to isolate a particular area during or after a fire to keep the public away from fire-related risks (e.g., smoke inhalation, airborne particulate matter, and damaged structures).

== Foreground (tape) and background colours ==
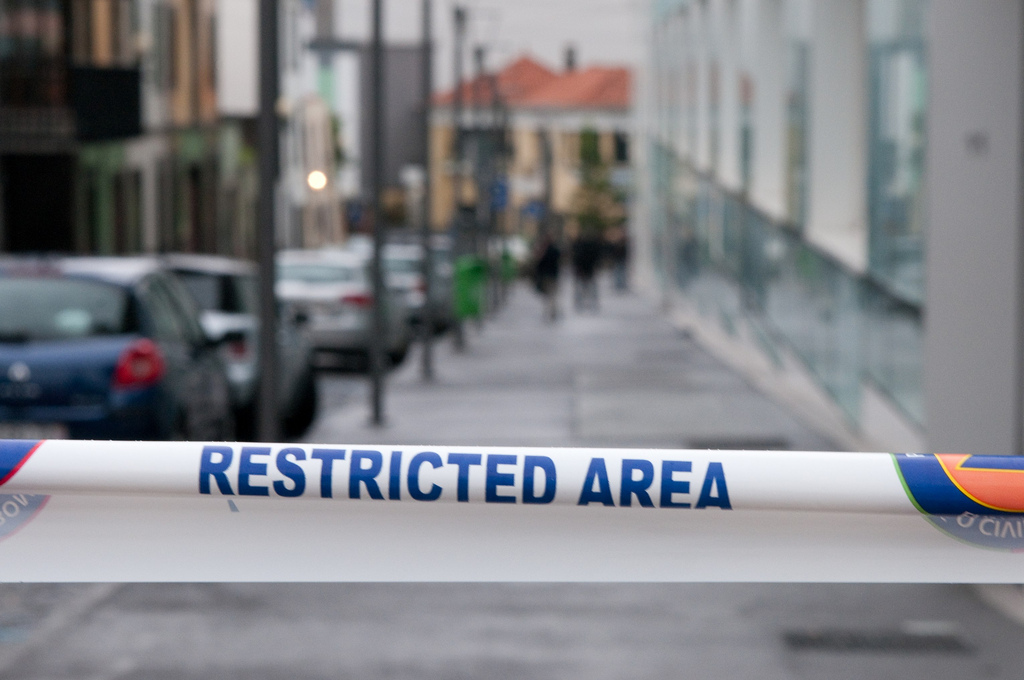
Barricade tape used by Madeira Civil Protection during the 2010 Madeira floods and mudslides

The choice of colours of barricade tape depends on the contrast with its background, which in the case of the sky, can vary from black to white. To have a reasonable chance of being visible against most backgrounds, the tape needs a light colour (white or yellow) and a darker colour.

== Requirements for barricade tape ==
Requirements for barricade tape vary according to the health and safety laws of the country or region it is being used in.

=== United States ===
OSHA and ANSI provide precise specification for barricade tape colors. These are found in OSHA regulations 1910.22 and 1910.144 and ANSI Z535.5-2007, Safety Tags and Barricade Tapes (for Temporary Hazards). However, the dimension, thickness, and materials of the barricade tape are left to the discretion of the manufacturer.

==== OSHA-specified barricade tape colors ====
1. Red / white for Fire Prevention and Protection Equipment.
2. Black / white for Housekeeping and Aisle Marking
3. Magenta / yellow for Radiation Hazards
4. Green / white for Safety and First Aid
5. Blue / white for Defective Machinery
6. Orange / white for Traffic and Caution Warning
7. Black / yellow for Physical Hazards

==== ANSI-specified barricade tape colors ====
1. Yellow/Black Barricade Tape serves as CAUTION and POTENTIAL HAZARD from:
  - Excavation less than 1.2 meters (4 feet) in depth
  - Identification of trip hazards and low hanging objects
  - Material storage on site
2. Red Barrication Tape indicates DANGER and SERIOUS HAZARD from:
  - Overhead work
  - Live electrical components
  - Scaffold under construction
  - Around swing radius of equipment with a rotating superstructure
3. Magenta (Purple)/Yellow Tape denotes DANGER and POSSIBLE RADIATION EXPOSURE
4. Underground warning tape (custom) warns about:
  - Digging underground gas-pipeline, electric cable and OFC cable installation
  - Custom thickness and width are available
  - Underground work
  - Protection from overground work

=== United Kingdom ===
Red and white tape (top) or yellow and black tape (bottom) can both be used to mark hazards under UK health and safety regulations.

Health and safety regulations state that markings should be placed around obstacles or dangerous locations. This includes where any of the following present a risk:

- people tripping or falling
- objects falling
- people or vehicles colliding with objects

These markings should be made up of alternating red and white or yellow and black stripes of equal size at a 45 degree angle. Barricade tape can be used to satisfy this requirement as long as the tape is "commensurate with the scale of the obstacle or dangerous location in question".

== See also ==
- Security tape
