= Health and Safety (Safety Signs and Signals) Regulations 1996 =

United Kingdom health and safety legislation

- Statutory Instrument
- Parliament of the United Kingdom
- Citation: SI 1996/341
- Territorial extent: Great Britain

Dates
- Made: 18 February 1996
- Laid before Parliament: 23 February 1996
- Commencement: 1 April 1996

Other legislation
- Repeals/revokes: Safety Signs Regulations 1980
- Transposes: Directive 92/58/EEC

Status: Current legislation

Text of statute as originally enacted

Text of the Health and Safety (Safety Signs and Signals) Regulations 1996 as in force today (including any amendments) within the United Kingdom, from legislation.gov.uk.

The Health and Safety (Safety Signs and Signals) Regulations 1996 (SI 1996/341) specify the safety signs within Great Britain; Northern Ireland has a similar law, the Health and Safety (Safety Signs and Signals) Regulations (Northern Ireland) 1996 (SI 1996/119). It was issued as a transposition of the European directive 92/58/EEC and replaced the Safety Signs Regulations 1980 (SI 1980/1471). They consist of "traditional safety signs", such as prohibitory and warning signs, along with hand signals, spoken and acoustic signals, and hazard marking.

== Background ==
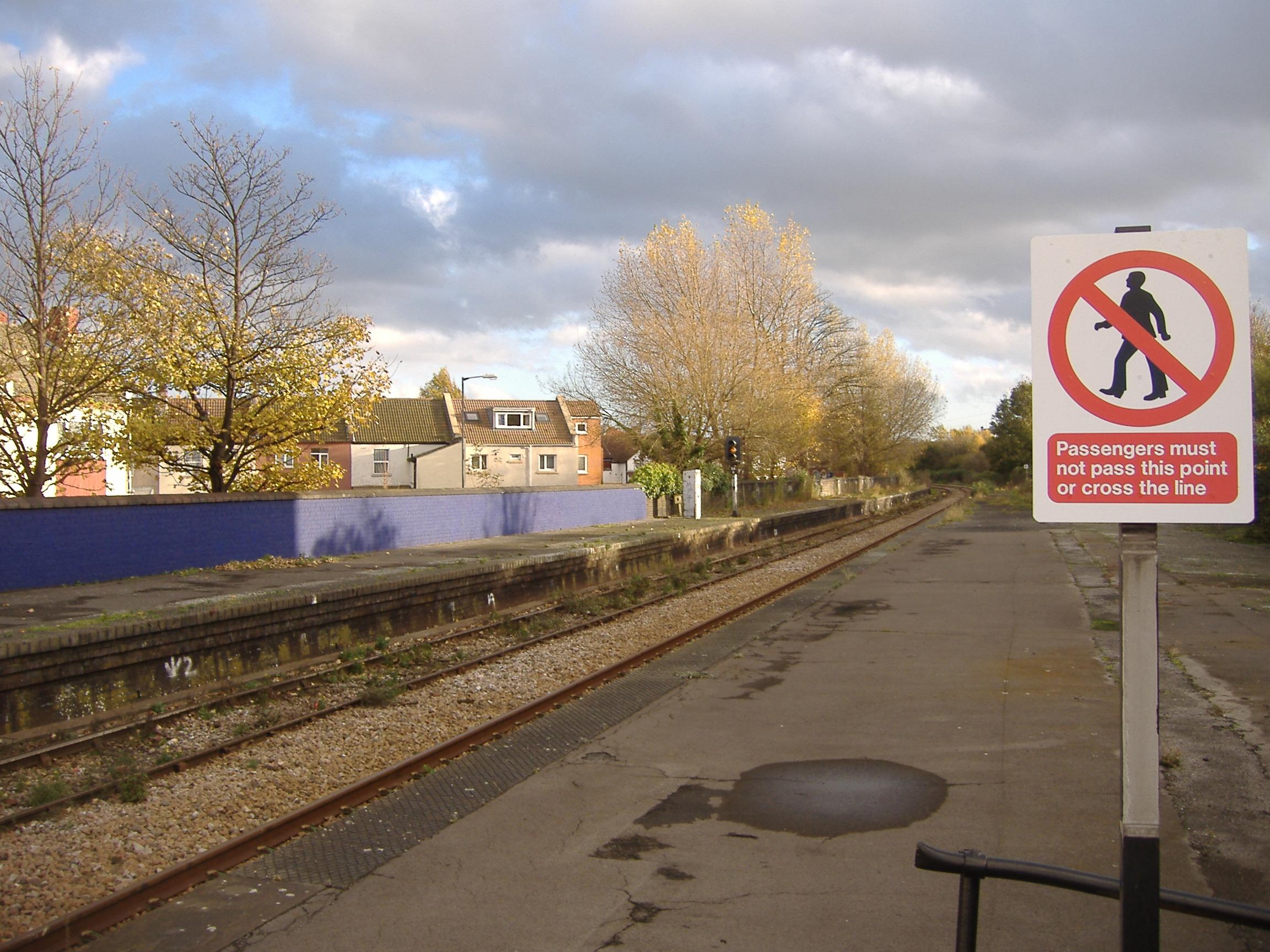
Safety sign designed in accordance with the 1996 Regulations

A mid-1980s safety sign, that did not comply with BS 5378:1.

Notable limitations to the previous legislation, the Safety Signs Regulations 1980 (SI 1980/1471), was that it excluded coal mining and tips; did not include signage related to fire fighting equipment, rescue/first aid equipment or emergency exits. The law also simply stated signage required under the Health and Safety at Work etc. Act 1974 shall comply with BS 5378:Part 1: 1980, providing no further information on where signs should be posted, the incorporation of text or sizing of signage. The standard also lacked this information as well as guidance on situations not effectively handled by a standard safety sign, such as blocking off hazardous areas, marking of traffic routes or use of acoustic or light signal for safety hazard.

== Application ==
The regulations apply to occupational health and safety within the territorial borders of Great Britain, also on offshore installations. It does not apply to the marking of dangerous goods and substances itself, only its storage or pipes, nor the regulation of road, rail, inland waterway, sea or air traffic, nor to signs used aboard of sea-going ships. For internal road traffic, traffic signs prescribed by the TSRGD, should be used.

The Regulations do not require the usage of safety signs and signals for non-employees, such as customers, visitors or the general public. However, section 3 of the Health and Safety at Work etc. Act 1974 requires employers to take reasonable efforts to protect the health and safety of non-employees from hazards posed by their work. The Regulations note that signs provided may be used for this purpose.

The Regulations require safety signage to be uniform and, as far as appropriate, without words, in order to be easily and fast understandable, without knowing the language. Minor differences between the prescribed signs and the installed signs are allowed, as long as the convey the same message. The Regulations also allow for designing a custom symbol when a suitable symbol does not exist in the regulation. The symbol should follow BS ISO 3864-1:2011 and BS ISO 3864-4:2011 to ensure compliance with basic design principal. The Health and Safety Executive specifically allows the usage of BS EN ISO 7010 safety signs.

Safety signs should only be used, if other measures of avoiding hazards failed. Also, if there is no risk, no safety signage should be used. Employees should regularly be instructed about the meaning of safety signs and signals. Employers are obligated to maintain the safety signage.

== Structure ==
The Health and Safety (Safety Signs and Signals) Regulations 1996 consists of 8 articles and 3 schedules.

=== Schedule 1 ===
==== Part I ====
As required in Annex I of the European directive 92/58/EEC, Schedule 1, Part I of the Regulations lays down a basic safety colour concept:

Colour	Meaning or purpose	Instructions and information
Red	Prohibition sign	Dangerous behaviour
Red	Danger alarm	Stop, shutdown, emergency cut out devices, Evacuate
Red	Fire-fighting equipment	Identification and location
Yellow or Amber	Warning sign	Be careful, take precautions
Yellow or Amber	Warning sign	Examine
Blue	Mandatory sign	Specific behaviour or action
Blue	Mandatory sign	Wear personal protective equipment
Green	Emergency escape, first aid sign	Doors, exits, routes, equipment, facilities
Green	No danger	Return to normal

==== Part II ====
Schedule 1, Part II defines five types of signboards, as shown below. They are also covered by BS 5378, Part 1 and 3 from 1980 and 1982, which have been superseded by BS EN ISO 7010. Safety signs must contain only symbols, not text. However, supplementary text plates may be used. For fire exits, the running man symbol should be used. Fire safety signs in use before the Regulations were in place could be used until 24 December 1998.

===== Prohibitory signs =====
No smoking

Smoking and naked flames forbidden

No access for pedestrians

Do not extinguish with water

Not drinkable

No access for unauthorised persons

No access for industrial vehicles

Do not touch

===== Warning signs =====
Flammable material or high temperature

Explosive material

Toxic material

Corrosive material

Radioactive material

Overhead load

Industrial vehicles

Danger: electricity

General danger

Laser beam (Note: 2002 version, see laser beam (1996) for original version.)

Oxidant material

Non-ionizing radiation

Strong magnetic field

Obstacles

Drop

Biological risk

Low temperature

===== Mandatory signs =====
Eye protection must be worn

Safety helmet must be worn

Ear protection must be worn

Respiratory equipment must be worn

Safety boots must be worn

Safety gloves must be worn

Safety overalls must be worn

Face protection must be worn

Safety harness must be worn

Pedestrians must use this route

General mandatory sign (to be accompanied where necessary by another sign)

===== Emergency escape or first-aid signs =====
Emergency exit/escape route

Emergency exit/escape route

Emergency exit/escape route

Emergency exit/escape route

Emergency exit/escape route

This way (supplementary information sign)

This way (supplementary information sign)

This way (supplementary information sign)

This way (supplementary information sign)

First-aid post

Stretcher

Safety shower

Eyewash

Emergency telephone for first-aid or escape

===== Fire-fighting signs =====
Fire hose

Ladder

Fire extinguisher (Note: 2002 version, see fire extinguisher (1996) for original version.)

Emergency fire telephone

This way (supplementary information sign)

This way (supplementary information sign)

This way (supplementary information sign)

This way (supplementary information sign)

==== Part III ====
This part, Minimum requirements governing signs on containers and pipes, defines the marking for the transport or storage of dangerous material by pipes and in containers, originally within the scope of the European directives 67/548/EEC and 1999/45/EC, which are both replaced by Regulation (EC) No 1272/2008, the CLP Regulation. For marking, the warning signs of Part II should be used.

Storage areas and rooms for dangerous substances are also required to be marked by suitable signage, either specifying the specific hazard, if all substances in the area have a common hazard, such as flammability, or using the 'general danger' symbol if different substances have various hazards. The regulation also explains differences and overlap with Dangerous Substances (Notification and Marking of Sites) Regulations 1990, which relates to requirements to mark facilities and sites where dangerous substances are stored in large quantities for firefighter safety.

==== Part IV ====
The Minimum requirements for the identification and location of fire-fighting equipment specifies, that, additionally to the Fire-fighting signs of Part II, the equipment for fire-fighting and its location has to be marked red.

==== Part V ====
In this part, the Minimum requirements governing signs used for obstacles and dangerous locations, and for marking traffic routes, requires hazardous places to be marked with either black and yellow or red and white markings. It also states that ways used for traffic have to be marked with either white or yellow stripes.

The Health and Safety Executive expects employers to establish and mark traffic routes when necessary to ensure workplace safety, such as where powered industrial trucks are in use, especially in proximity to workers on foot. Employers are also expected to take steps to ensure safe flow of traffic, such as providing a banksman to guide reversing vehicles near people on foot or near hazardous conditions such as a drop off.

==== Part VI ====
Part VI, Minimum requirements for illuminated signs, requires illuminated signs to be single-coloured or to contain a symbol. If the latter is the case, it should comply with Part II. If a flashing light and a sound are used together, they have to be synchronized.

==== Part VII ====
This part, the Minimum requirements for acoustic signals, requires acoustic signals to be understandable and not harmful. If the acoustic signal is an fire alarm, it has to be continuing.

==== Part VIII ====
The Minimum requirements for verbal communication defines the use of language for safety purposes. It also defines coded words:

	Meaning
start	to indicate the start of a command
stop	to interrupt or end a movement
end	to stop the operation
raise	to have a load raised
lower	to have a load lowered
forwards	to be co-ordinated with the corresponding hand signals
backwards	to be co-ordinated with the corresponding hand signals
right	to be co-ordinated with the corresponding hand signals
left	to be co-ordinated with the corresponding hand signals
danger	for an emergency stop
quickly	to speed up a movement for safety reasons

==== Part IX ====
Hand signals should only be given by one instructor. Other hand signals are also allowed, as specified in Schedule 2.

Meaning	Description	Illustration
A. General signals
START Attention Start of Command	both arms are extended horizontally with the palms facing forwards	HSR 1996 IX 3a
STOP Interruption End of movement	the right arm points upwards with the palm facing forwards	HSR 1996 IX 3b
END of the operation	both hands are clasped at chest height	HSR 1996 IX 3c
B. Vertical movements
RAISE	the right arm points upwards with the palm facing forward and slowly makes a circle	HSR 1996 IX 3d
LOWER	the right arm points downwards with the palm facing inwards and slowly makes a circle	HSR 1996 IX 3e
VERTICAL DISTANCE	the hands indicate the relevant distance	HSR 1996 IX 3f
C. Horizontal Movements
MOVE FORWARDS	both arms are bent with the palms facing upwards, and the forearms make slow movements towards the body	HSR 1996 IX 3g
MOVE BACKWARDS	both arms are bent with the palms facing downwards, and the forearms make slow movements away from the body	HSR 1996 IX 3h
RIGHT to the signalman's	the right arm is extended more or less horizontally with palm facing downwards and slowly makes small movements to the right	HSR 1996 IX 3i
LEFT to the signalman's	the left arm is extended more or less horizontally with palm facing downwards and slowly makes small movements to the left	HSR 1996 IX 3j
HORIZONTAL DISTANCE	the hands indicate the relevant distance.	HSR 1996 IX 3k
D. Danger
DANGER Emergency stop	both arms points upwards with the palms facing forwards	HSR 1996 IX 3l
QUICK	all movements faster	
SLOW	all movements slower	

== Updates since 1996 ==
Differences between 1996 and 2002 symbols

1996 Laser beam symbol

2002 Laser beam symbol

1996 fire extinguisher symbol

2002 fire extinguisher symbol

Since its introduction in 1996, the Regulations have undergone some changes. An unexplained change occurred between 2000 and 2002. In the third printing of document L64, Safety Signs and Signals - The Health and Safety (Safety Signs and Signals) Regulations 1996 - Guidance on Regulations in 2000, the symbol for laser beam and fire extinguisher are depicted as originally drawn in the diagrams in the 1996 statutory instrument. The laser beam symbol depicts the laser beam originating from the bottom of the triangle. The fire extinguisher symbol depicts a fire extinguisher, that lacks a 'discharge horn' for discharging extinguishing agent; consisting only of a tank body and the handle at the top. The fourth printing, in 2002, these two symbols depictions change. The laser beam symbol now depicts the laser beam originating from the right side of the triangle. The fire extinguisher symbol gained a 'discharge horn' and the handle on top is also flipped to face right. The 2002 printing makes no references to this change and no amendment appears in the statutory instrument to modify the two symbols, which are still depicted in the statutory instrument in the original 1996 design. The subsequent major updates to document L64, released in 2009 and 2015 depict the two symbols according to the 2002 design, and also make no references to the symbol design changes from the 1996 designs in the statutory instrument or earlier editions of L64.

The withdrawn 'Harmful or irritant material' symbol

The 'Harmful or irritant material' warning sign was completely removed from the Regulations on 6 January, 2015. This was in response to CLP Regulations amending Directive 92/58/EEC to remove the sign as part of harmonization with Globally Harmonized System of Classification and Labelling of Chemicals, which discontinued use of an "X" to identify harmful and irritating substances.

In 2015, the third edition of Safety Signs and Signals, by the Health and Safety Executive was released. The guidance reinforced existing guidance that "small differences from the pictograms or symbols shown in Schedule 1 of the Regulations are acceptable" by directly referencing that EN ISO 7010 symbols were considered to be acceptable for use instead of the designs provided in the Regulations, as they conformed to the 'intrinsic features' specified in the law. Also reinforced was the removal of 'harmful or irritating material' symbol the with a clear instruction that the symbol should not be used and other applicable symbols should be used instead. While not part of the Regulations, information about the GHS hazard pictograms from Annex V of the CLP Regulations are included to explain how these two regulations interact with each other and guidance on which set of symbols should be used in various situations.

== Legacy ==
Railway overhead live wire sign

Pre-1996 'red warning flash' design

Post-1996 design

Health and Safety (Safety Signs and Signals) Regulations 1996 brought about a significant move to uniformity in the appearance safety sign design in the United Kingdom. British Rail's successor Railtrack started to phase out usage of the railway's 'red warning flash' signage, in use for over 35 years, in August 1997. The railway's signs for warning staff of areas of limited clearance, marked by simple chequered board design dating back to 1952, was also to be phased out in favour of a standard warning design to comply with the requirements of the Regulations. However, the chequered design has persisted in the railway environment, still part of the relevant Rail Safety and Standards Board safety sign design standards as of 2025, nearly 30 years after the 1996 legislation's enactment, owing to staff familiarity with the previous non-standard design.

== See also ==
- Traffic Signs Regulations and General Directions, a similar statutory instrument for traffic signs
- Globally Harmonized System of Classification and Labelling of Chemicals
- Directive 92/58/EEC
- Napo in... The Best Signs Story
