= Zero Project =

Disability organization based in Austria

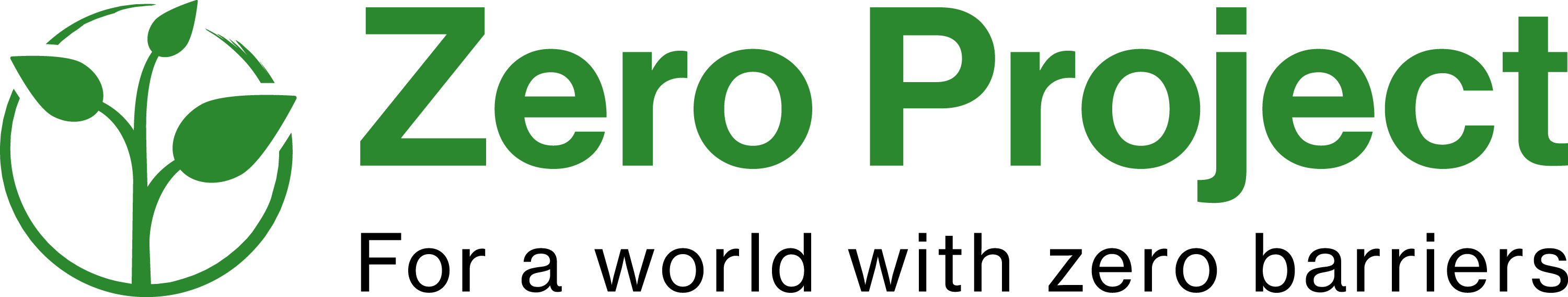
- Zero Project. For a world with zero barriers.
- Established: 2009
- Founder: Martin Essl
- Type: Nonprofit
- Headquarters: Vienna, Austria
- President: Michael Fembek
- Executive directors: Anna Königseder, Robin Tim Weis
- Website: www.zeroproject.org

The Zero Project is a non-profit based in Vienna, Austria, which focuses on researching and sharing innovative solutions that support the rights of people with disabilities globally. Zero Project publishes an annual report of innovative solutions for persons with disabilities, holds an accessible conference annually to share these solutions, and partners with other organizations to support innovators in scaling up their solutions globally.

== History ==
Zero Project is an initiative of the Essl Foundation (Essl Foundation MGE gemeinnützige Privatstiftung). The Essl Foundation was established by Martin and Gerda Essl and their children in order to support social innovations and scientific research. The purpose of the Essl Foundation is to support people in need, to increase the public awareness of this support. To this end, the Zero Project researches, selects, and shares broadly solutions towards supporting persons with disabilities.

In 2009, the Essl Foundation began researching how to measure the implementation of the United Nations Convention on the Rights of Persons with Disabilities (UN CRPD), which was ratified by Austria in 2008. They published a report, ESSL SOCIAL INDEX PILOT STUDY 2010, in 2010.

Following this, in 2011 the Essl Foundation formally renamed this initiative "the Zero Project: for a world without barriers". The first Zero Project Report was published on December 3, 2011, the International Day of Persons with Disabilities.

In 2012, Zero Project organized the first annual conference in Vienna, Austria, to further share Zero Project research with persons with disabilities, practitioners, and disability experts.It was held at the Palais Niederösterreich, on January 22–23, 2012, hosting over 200 participants from more than 30 countries. The Zero Project Conference 2013 continued to grow, with more than 250 experts and persons with lived experience participating.

In 2013, Zero Project presented research at a side event of a session of the United Nations Human Rights Council in Geneva, Switzerland. The research presented focused directly on the employment issues addressed in the UN Convention on the Rights of Persons with Disabilities (UN CRPD). This marked the beginning of a cooperative relationship with the United Nations and Zero Project.

In 2014, the Zero Project Conference was held for the first time in at the United Nations Office at Vienna, where it has been held annually ever since. Due to the research through Zero Project, the Essl Foundation was granted ESOSOC Special status by the United Nations Economic and Social Council.

== Research ==
Zero Project researches and selects innovative solutions from around the world that successfully uphold the United Nations Convention on the Rights of Persons with Disabilities. There are four central themes: Accessibility, Employment, Education, and Independent Living & Political Participation. Each year since 2020, innovative solutions in Information and Communications Technology (ICT) are also included.

=== Innovation ===
Any practice or policy will have demonstrated an innovative and effective solution in support of removing barriers in one of the five areas of the Zero Project's research focus. The research takes into account the local context, geographies, and groups of beneficiaries.

=== Impact ===
The impact of a particular solution could refer to the number of beneficiaries or people using a service, the solution's growth rate, or the influence on improved public services, among others. Any selected solution must have been deployed and created impact; the selection process does not consider projects, or products at a concept stage.

=== Scalability ===
All nominations are reviewed for their potential in replicating and expanding to new geographies or growing in another way that allows a maximum number of persons with disabilities to benefit from the innovation.

== Zero Project Awardees ==
Every year, Zero Project selects approximately 75 Awardees, with solutions demonstrating clear excellence in the research parameters of innovation, impact, and scalability.

Rotating on a 4-year cycle, the research process and Awardee selection focuses on the following 4 topics:

- Independent Living & Political Participation
- Inclusive Education
- Employment
- Accessibility

Since 2020, Information and Communication Technologies (ICT) is also covered every year.

These solutions are presented annually in the Zero Project Report.

The Awardees are invited to the annual conference at the United Nations Office in Vienna, Austria, to present their solutions to an audience of policymakers, governmental figures, practitioners and experts.

== Zero Project Conference ==
The Zero Project Conference (ZeroCon) brings together experts, policy makers, corporations, practitioners and persons with lived experience from all different sectors of society, in order to share proven solutions towards zero barriers for persons with disabilities. ZeroCon is held annually at the United Nations Office at Vienna.

ZeroCon holds an award ceremony during which that year's Awardees are presented with the Zero Project Award, indicating the project's innovation, impact, and scalability. These Awardees are invited to present their projects to participants in a variety of formats, including presentations, forums, and workshops.

ZeroCon incorporates good practices in conference accessibility, including such support as induction loops for hearing, tactile flooring, International Sign, large-print agendas, and volunteer assistance.

Since 2021, many sessions from ZeroCon have been broadcast live and later provided for on-demand viewing on the Zero Project YouTube Channel, with captioning and International Sign.

== Awards received ==
The Zero Project has been awarded with the Global Alliance on Accessible Technologies and Environments Award of Recognition in 2015
