= Directive 92/58/EEC =

European Directive harmonizing safety signs

- European Union directive
- Title: COUNCIL DIRECTIVE 92/58/EEC of 24 June 1992 on the minimum requirements for the provision of safety and/or health signs at work (ninth individual Directive within the meaning of Article 16 (1) of Directive 89/391/EEC)
- Made by: Council
- Journal reference: L 245, 26 August 1992, pp. 23–42

History
- Date made: 24 June 1992
- Entry into force: 22 July 1992

Other legislation
- Replaces: Directive 77/576/EEC
- Amended by: Regulation (EU) 2019/1243; Directive 2014/27

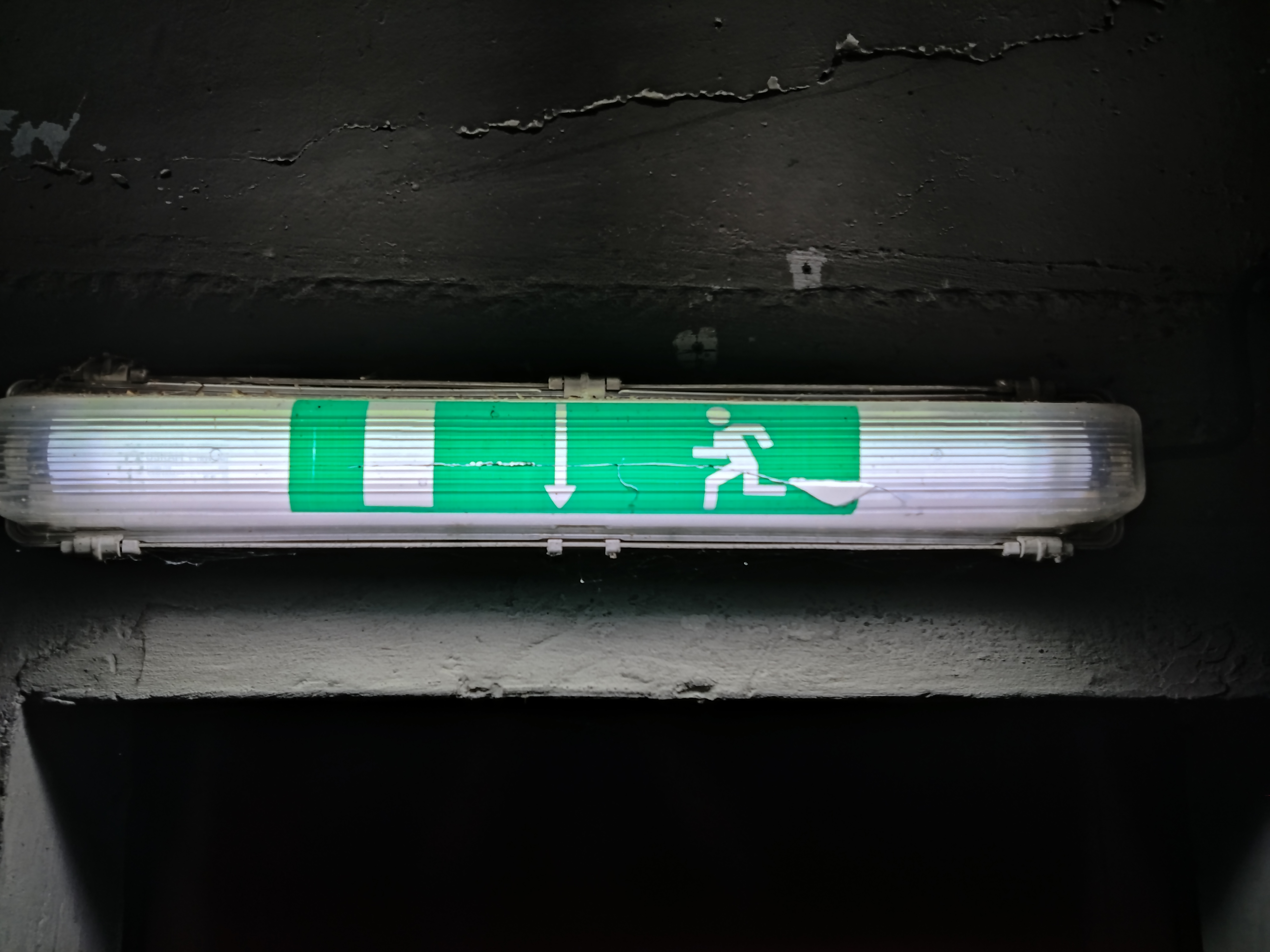
An exit sign designed in accordance with the Directive

The Directive 92/58/EEC specifies the minimum requirements for safety signs within the European Union. It superseded the Directive 77/576/EEC. While not being replaced by the standard ISO 7010, both signage systems can be used. This directive does not apply to signage used for controlling roadway, railway, waterway or air transportation.

== Structure ==
Directive 92/58/EEC consists of 3 sections, 12 articles and 9 annexes. Section one simply defines the function of the directive, as well as provide definitions. Section 2 specifies that employers are required to post safety/health signs, whenever a hazard can't be eliminated. It also provides guidance to member states regarding adoption of the directive in their laws and the implementation of the law. Signs already in use had to be brought up to Directive 92/58/EEC standards within 18 months after 24 June 1994. Signs posted on or after 24 June 1994 were required to comply with the directive when posted. Section 3 contained the effective date for the directive, repealed the older Directive 77/576, and reporting obligations of member states to the European Commission.

== Annexes ==
The nine annexes of the directive layout the actual designs and requirements of signs regulated by the directive.

=== Annex I ===
Annex I, General Minimum Requirements Concerning Safety And/Or Health Signs At Work, lays out the types of signs, the colors used on signs, and the implementation/installation of signs.

Colour	Purpose	Examples
Red	Prohibited sign	Restriction of dangerous or undesirable behaviours or objects
Red	Danger alarm	Stop, shutdown, evacuate, identification and location of emergency stop switches
Red	Fire-fighting equipment	Identification and location of fire-fighting equipment
Yellow/amber	Warning sign	Identification of hazards
Blue	Mandatory sign	requiring a specific behaviour or action, wearing personal protective equipment
Green	Emergency escape, first aid sign	location and identification of doors, exits, evacuation routes, equipment and facilities
Green	No danger	Return to normal working

=== Annex II (Signboards) ===
Annex II, Minimum General Requirements Concerning Signboards, spells out the designs of symbols used in the directive. While specific symbol designs are provided, pictograms are permitted to vary so long as the variation in design does not reduce the symbol's effectiveness at conveying its meaning.

The directive contains five categories of signs, as shown below:

==== Prohibitory signs ====
No smoking

Smoking and naked flames forbidden

No access for pedestrians

Do not extinguish with water

Not drinkable

No access for unauthorized persons

No access for industrial trucks

Do not touch

==== Warning signs ====
Flammable material or high temperature

Explosive material

Toxic material

Corrosive material

Radioactive material

Overhead load

Industrial vehicles

Danger: electricity

General danger

Laser beam

Oxidant material

Non-ionizing radiation

Strong magnetic field

Obstacles

Drop

Biological risk

Low temperature

Harmful or irritant material
(Withdrawn 2014)

==== Mandatory signs ====
Eye protection must be worn

Safety helmet must be worn

Ear protection must be worn

Respiratory equipment must be worn

Safety boots must be worn

Safety gloves must be worn

Safety overalls must be worn

Face protection must be worn

Safety harness must be worn

Pedestrians must use this route

General mandatory sign (to be accompanied where necessary by another sign)

==== Emergency escape or first-aid signs ====
Emergency exit/escape route

Emergency exit/escape route

Emergency exit/escape route

Emergency exit/escape route

Emergency exit/escape route

This way (supplementary information sign)

This way (supplementary information sign)

This way (supplementary information sign)

This way (supplementary information sign)

First-aid post

Stretcher

Safety shower

Eyewash

Emergency telephone for first-aid or escape

==== Fire-fighting signs ====
Fire hose

Ladder

Fire extinguisher

Emergency fire telephone

This way (supplementary information sign)

This way (supplementary information sign)

This way (supplementary information sign)

This way (supplementary information sign)

=== Annex III ===
Annex III, Minimum Requirements Governing Signs on Containers and Pipes', lays out specific requirements for labeling of piping systems and storage containers containing dangerous substances defined by Directives 67/548 and 88/379.

=== Annex IV ===
Annex IV, Minimum Requirements for the identification and location of fire-fighting equipment, is specific to fire-fighting equipment, specifying that red should be used to mark the equipment and its storage location, to supplement the fire-fighting signage provided in Annex III.

=== Annex V ===
Black and yellow hazard stripes defined by Annex V.

Annex V, Minimum Requirements Governing Signs Used For Obstacles and Dangerous Locations, and Marking Traffic Routes, lays out the use of colored stripes for marking obstacles and identifying of traffic routes in work places.

=== Annex VI ===
Annex VI, Minimum Requirements for Illuminated Signs, sets standards for the use of illuminated signage, the incorporation of colors and pictograms, as defined in Annex I and II and usage with acoustic signals.

=== Annex VII ===
Annex VII, Minimum requirements for Acoustic Signs, sets requirements for sound signals, such as horns, sirens, alarm bells.

=== Annex VIII ===
Annex VIII, Minimum requirements for Verbal Communication, sets requirements for communications using words, and defines specific code words.

Code word	Meaning
Start	To indicate the start of a command
Stop	To interrupt or end a movement
End	To stop the operation
Raise	To have a load raised
Lower	To have a load lowered
Forwards	To be coordinated with the corresponding hand signals
Backwards	To be coordinated with the corresponding hand signals
Right	To be coordinated with the corresponding hand signals
Left	To be coordinated with the corresponding hand signals
Danger	For an emergency stop
Quickly	To speed up a movement for safety reasons

=== Annex IX ===
Annex IX, Minimum Requirements for Hand Signals, describes specific hand signals and the requirements of a "signalman", the person giving the hand signs.

Meaning	Description	Illustration
A. General Signals
Start. Attention. Start of command.	Both arms extended horizontally with the palms facing forward.	
Stop. Interruption. End of movement.	The right arm points upward with the palm facing forwards.	
End of the operation.	Both hands are clasped at chest height.	
B. Vertical Movements
Raise	The right arm points skywards with the palm facing forward and slowly makes a circle.	
Lower	The right arm points downwards with the palm facing inwards and slowly makes a circle.	
Vertical Distance	The hands indicate the relevant distance.	
C. Horizontal Movements
Move forwards.	Both arms are bent with the palms facing upwards, and the forearms make slow movements towards the body.	
Move backwards.	Both arms are bent with the palms facing downwards, and the forearms make slow movements away from the body.	
Right to the signalman.	The right arm is extended more or less horizontally with the palm facing downwards and slowly makes small movements to the right.	
Left to the signalman.	The left arm is extended more or less horizontally with the palm facing downwards and slowly makes small movements to the left.	
Horizontal Distance	The hands indicate the relevant distance	
D. Danger
Danger. Emergency stop.	Both arms point upwards with the palms facing forwards.	
Quick	Make all movements faster	—N/a
Slow	Make all movements slower	—N/a

== Implementation in member states ==
European member states adopted the directive in the following legal acts in their nation.

- Austria: Kennzeichnungsverordnung
- Belgium: Arrêté royal du 17 juin 1997
- Bulgaria: РД-07/8 от 20 декември 2008 г.
- Croatia: NN 29/2005
- Cyprus: Σημανσης Ασφαλειας Και Υγειας Στους Χωρους Εργασιας 2012
- Czechia: Č 11/2002 Sb. (Replaced by Č 375/2017 Sb.)
- Denmark: BEK nr 1246 af 11/12/2009
- Estonia: Vastu võetud 30.11.1999 nr 75 Ohumärguannete kasutamise nõuded töökohas
- Finland: Nr. 687/2015
- France: Arrêté du 4 novembre 1993 relatif à la signalisation de sécurité et de santé au travail
- Germany: Arbeitsstättenverordnung, specified by Technische Regel für Arbeitsstätten ASR A1.3
- Greece: Π.Δ. 105/1995
- Hungary: 2/1998. (I. 16.) MüM rendelet a munkahelyen alkalmazandó biztonsági és egészségvédelmi jelzésekről
- Ireland: Safety, Health and Welfare At Work (Signs) Regulations, 1995
- Italy: Decreto Legislativo 14 agosto 1996, n. 493, replaced by Decreto Legislativo 9 aprile 2008, n. 81
- Latvia: Rīgā 2002.gada 3.septembrī prot. Nr.37 17.§
- Lithuania: 1999 m. lapkričio 24 d. Nr. 95 Vilnius
- Malta: S.L.424.16 2002
- Netherlands: Arbeidsomstandighedenregeling
- Portugal: Portaria n.º 1456-A 1995, de 11 de dezembro
- Romania: Hotararea de Guvern 971 din 2006
- Slovakia:Z.z. 387/2006
- Slovenia:Uradni list RS, št. 34/10
- Spain: Real Decreto n° 485/97
- Sweden: AFS 2008-13 (Replaced by AFS 2020-1)

== Similar implementation in non-EU member states ==
- Iceland: Stjtíð. B, nr. 707/1995
- India: IS 9457 2005 (A copy of the preceding standard 77/576/EEC was also active in India as IS 9457 1980)
- Northern Cyprus: 35/2008 Sayılı Yasa
- Norway: Forskrift 6. oktober 1994 nr. 972
- Ukraine: Кабінету Міністрів України постанова від 25 листопада 2009 р. N 1262 Київ
- Turkey: Resmi Gazete Tarihi: 25325/2003
- United Kingdom: The Health and Safety (Safety Signs and Signals) Regulations 1996 (Passed when an EU member, no longer a member.) The Law and Sign Standard is still in force and in-accordance with the EU (2024)

== See also ==
- ISO 3864 - ISO standard for safety sign design
- ISO 7010 - ISO standard for safety symbols
- Napo in... The Best Signs Story
