= Exit sign =

Sign towards the nearest building exit

Post-1982 Japanese exit sign ("running man") designed by Yukio Ota in 1979. ISO Standard (1987) sign in parts of Asia-Pacific, Europe, and the Americas; actual implementations vary slightly

The red or green EXIT sign is more common in North America, especially in the United States. A red version was previously used in Canada, but this has been replaced by the ISO standard 'running man' sign.

Sign used in the European Union as according to European Economic Council Directive 92/58/EEC

An exit sign is a pictogram or short text in a public facility (such as a building, aircraft, or boat) marking the location of the closest emergency exit to be used in an emergency that necessitates rapid evacuation. Most fire, building, health, and safety codes require exit signs that are always lit.

Exit signs are intended to be unmistakable and understandable by anyone who can see. In the past, this generally meant exit signs that show the word "EXIT" or the equivalent in the local language; increasingly, exit signs around the world are now pictograms, often without supplementary text.

== History ==
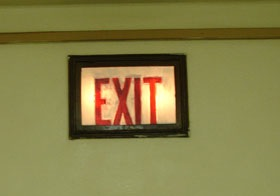
A dim early exit sign lit by a pair of incandescent bulbs

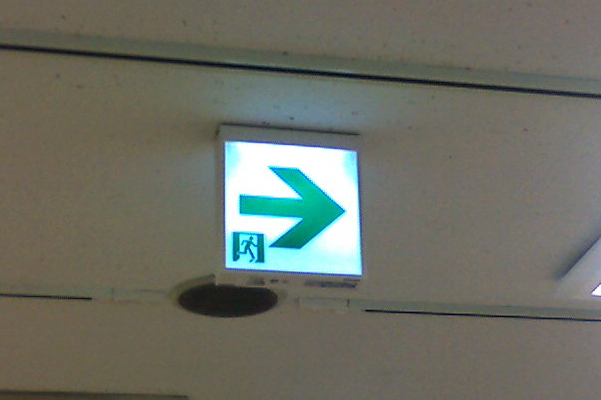
A right pointing exit sign in Japan with a design that is easier to see, even in poor visibility, emergency lighting can be seen immediately above

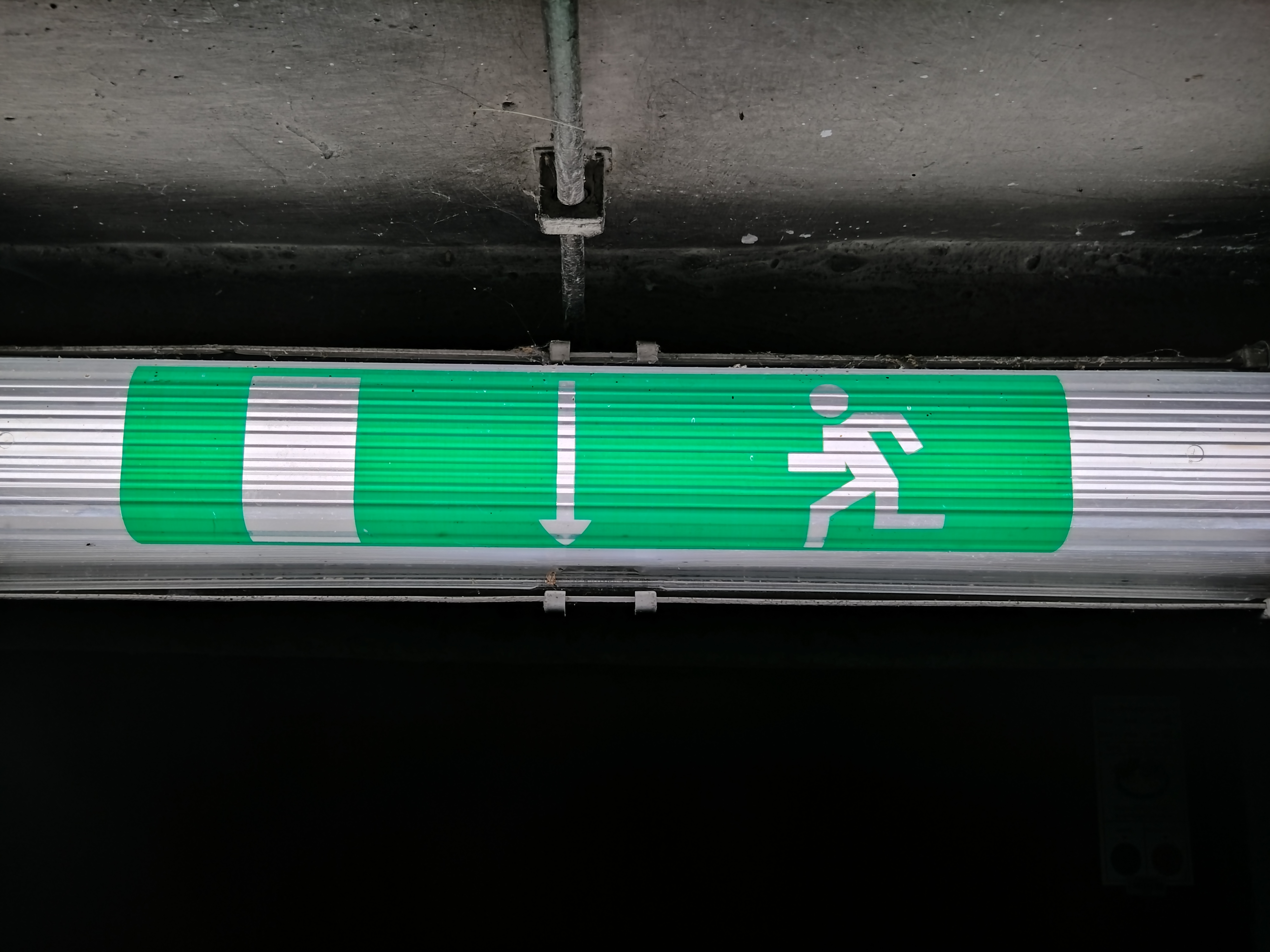
The design formerly used in Europe, as specified in Directive 92/58/EEC, lit by a fluorescent lamp

Early exit signs generally either were made of metal and lit by a nearby incandescent light bulb or were a white glass cover with "EXIT" written in red, placed directly in front of a single-bulb light fixture. A flaw in these designs was that in a fire the power to the light often failed. In addition, the fixtures, despite their brightness, could be hard to see through smoke. The biggest problem was that the exit sign was hardly distinguishable from an ordinary safety lighting fixture commonly installed above doors in the past. The problem was partially solved by using red-tinted bulbs instead.

Better signs were soon developed that more resembled today's modern exit sign, with an incandescent bulb in a rectangular box that backlit the word "EXIT" on one or both sides. Larger than its predecessors, this version of the exit sign was easier to see. The sign was still only useful as long as mains power remained on.

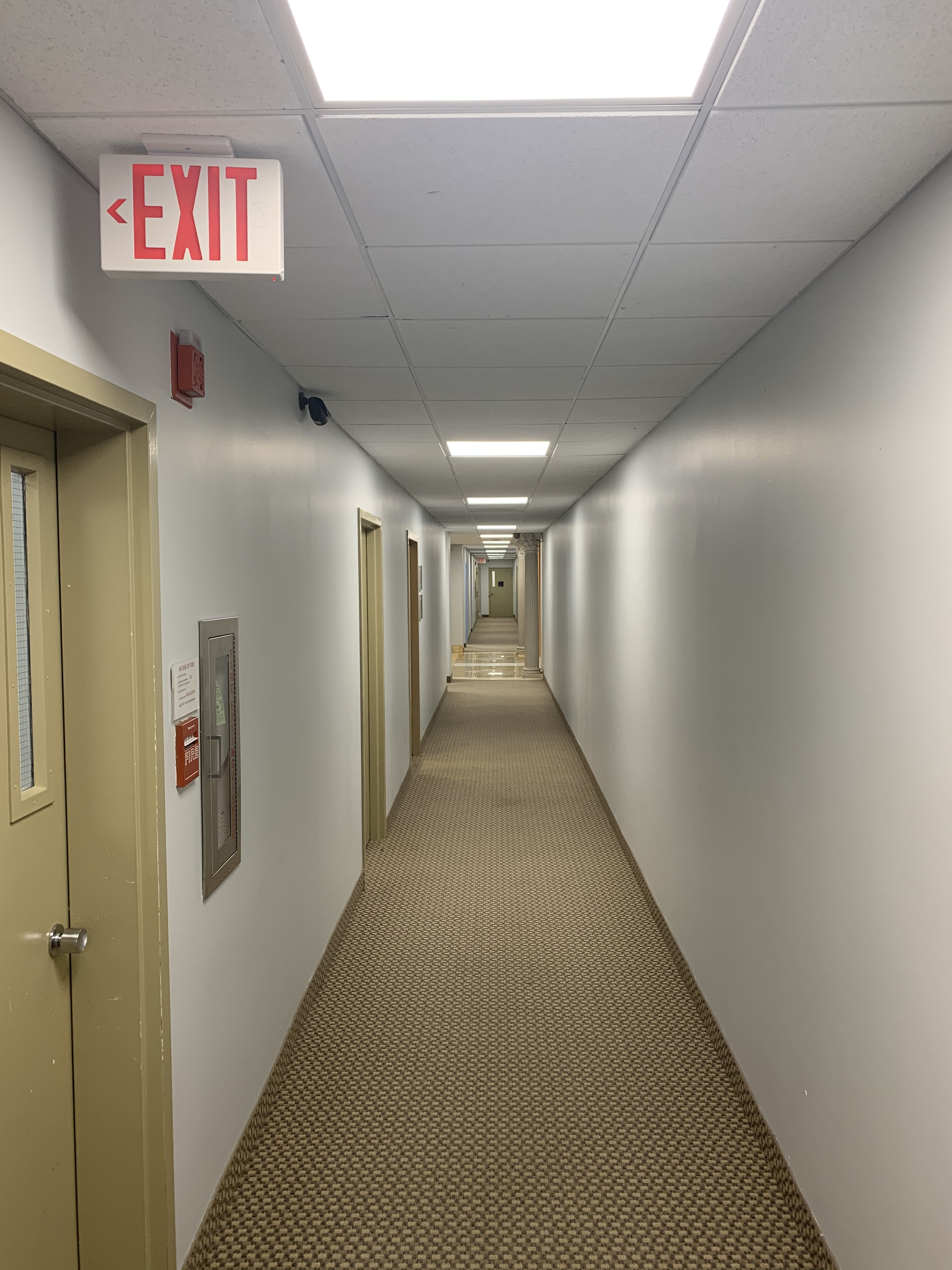
An empty hallway with an exit sign in the foreground

As battery-backup systems became smaller and more efficient, some exit signs began to use a dual-power system. Under normal conditions, the exit sign was lit by mains power and the battery was maintained in a charged state. In the event of a power outage, the battery would supply power to light the sign. Early battery-backup systems were big, heavy, and costly. Modern systems are lightweight, can be installed virtually anywhere, and are integrated into the fixture, rather than requiring a separate box. As batteries improved, so did the amount of time that a fixture could remain lit on batteries.

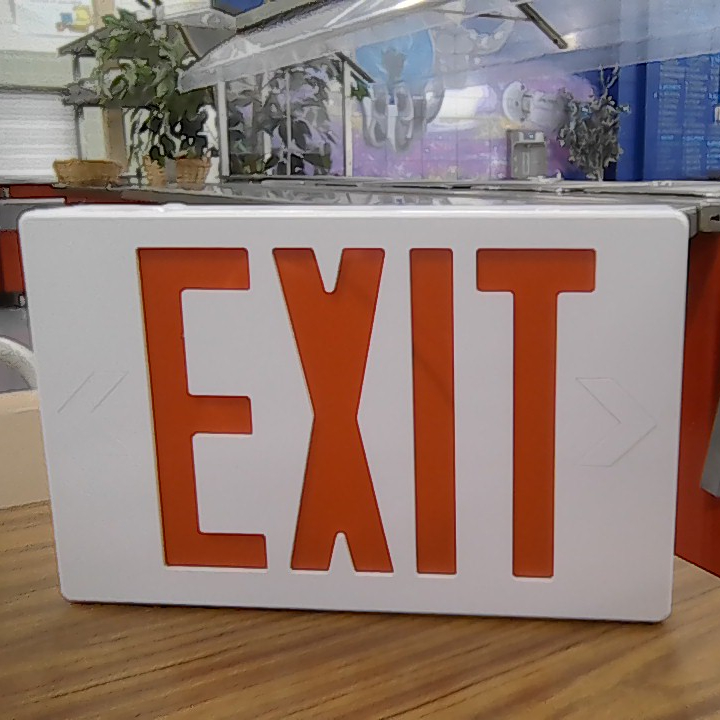
An exit sign

While exit signs were more visible due to large letters, even a 60-watt incandescent bulb shining through a plastic or glass cover could appear somewhat dim under certain conditions. Incandescent bulbs are still in use because they are cheap and common, even though they use more electricity and require more or less frequent replacement. Incandescent bulbs lit 24/7 have a greatly extended lifespan compared to ones that cycle on and off. When used in exit signs, they are often operated at a lower voltage than rated, which further extends their lifetime, at the trade-off of reduced light output and greatly reduced energy efficiency.

With the development of fluorescent lamp and light-emitting diode technology, exit signs could be made even brighter to compensate for the limited visibility in a fire situation, while using less electricity. Fluorescent lamps are used in the same way as incandescent bulbs, back-lighting both sides of an exit fixture from within. LED signs combine a large number of bright light-emitting diodes to illuminate the sign from inside. An exit sign is constantly lit; fluorescent bulbs need to be changed more often than LEDs, although the absence of frequent on/off cycles extends the life of fluorescent lamps significantly. Generally, LEDs have a very long life, and may last for 10 years or more of continuous use, although their brightness may gradually diminish.

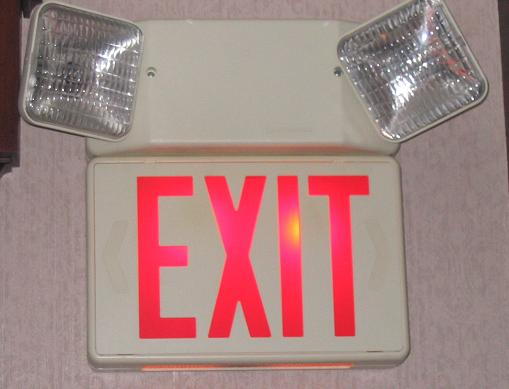
Exit sign with lights.

Radio-luminescent and phosphorescent signs that require no electricity have also been developed, and have been used since the 1970s. Radio-luminescence uses the radioactive decay of tritium gas to illuminate the sign, while phosphorescence uses light-emitting pigments to glow in the dark. While both of these types of signs meet California State Fire Marshal standards, electricity is used in the vast majority of signs.

== Modern installations ==
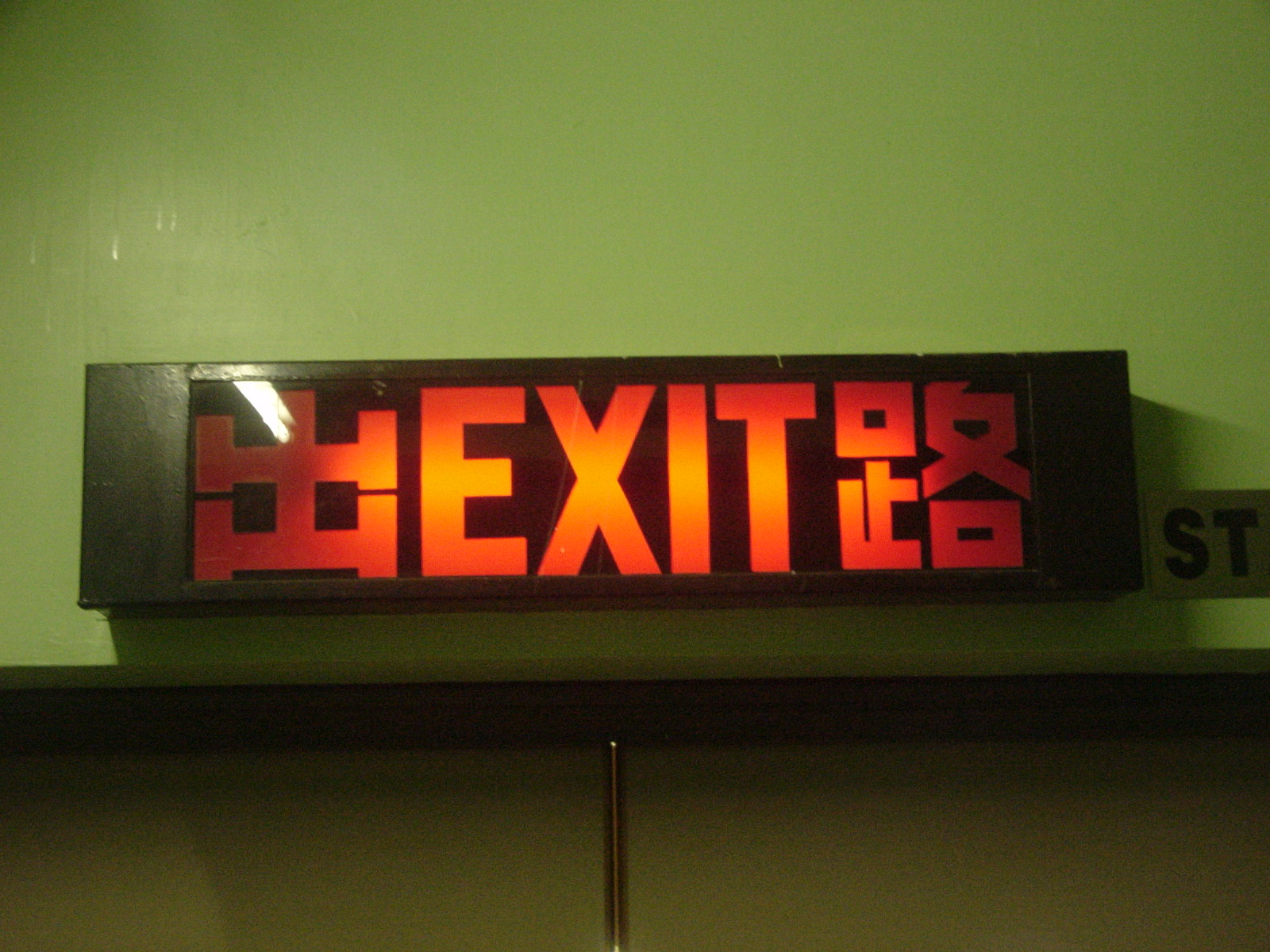
Old sign still used in some old Hong Kong buildings

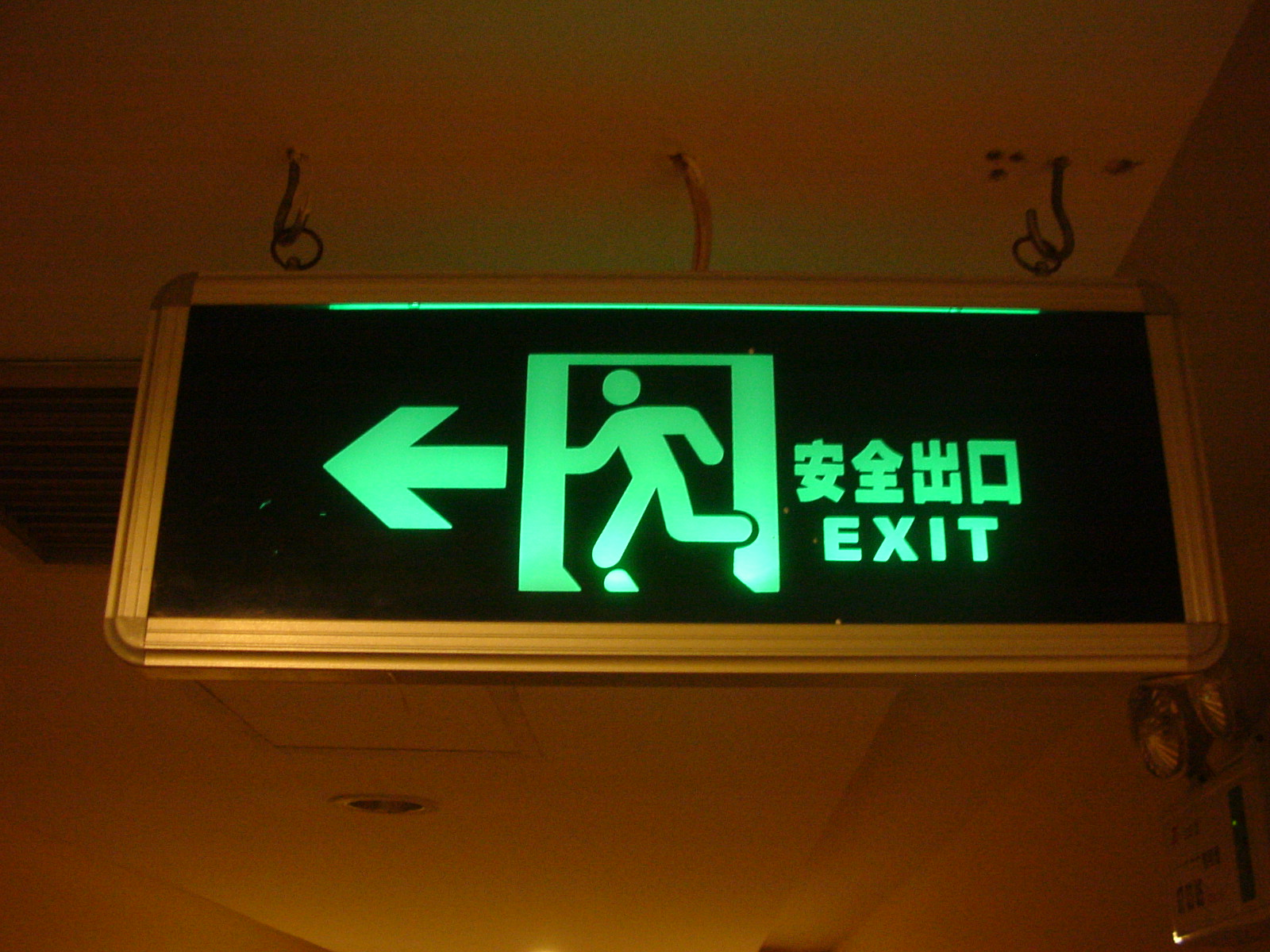
Standard Chinese sign

Most exit signs in the world use pictograms. Sometimes paired with a combination of text to indicate the direction of emergency exits. However, countries such as the United States and Philippines refuse to strictly enforce it at all. Though, former adopters of text based EXIT signs such as Canada, Singapore, and Hong Kong have changed their safety codes to encourage the use of pictograms. The Philippines, a country which lacks a uniform standard, uses pictograms; signs reading "EXIT", "FIRE EXIT", or "EMERGENCY EXIT"; and combinations of pictograms and text.

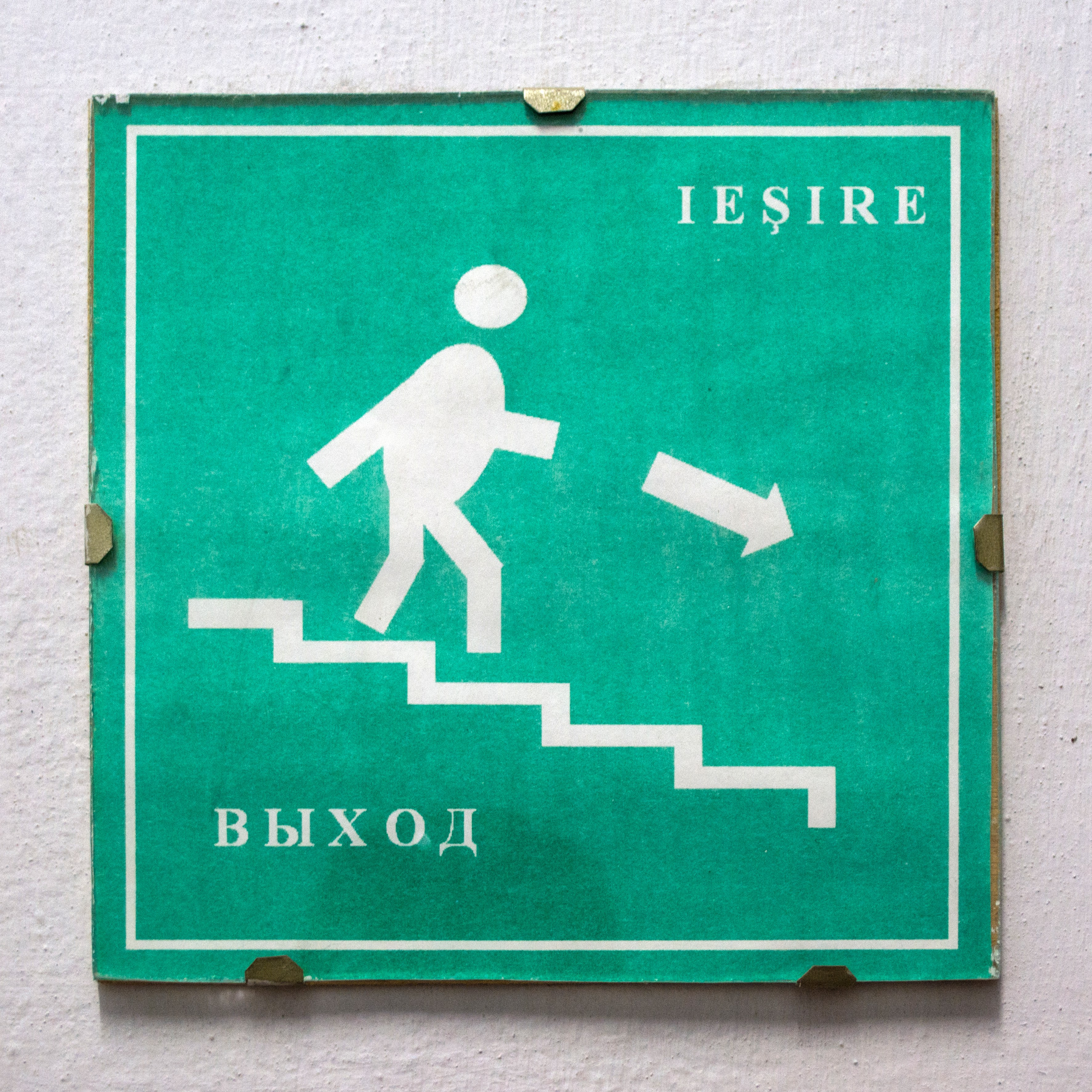
An old Romanian-Russian exit sign showing an old "running man" pictogram, designed by the Soviet Union

In the United States, the International Building Code, and in some jurisdictions, National Fire Protection Association (NFPA) 101 Life Safety Code, generally define the standard for exit signs. The IBC, starting with the 2021 edition, allows pictograms for internally illuminated exit signs, and the 2027 edition does so for all exit signs, whether internally or externally illuminated. NFPA 101 - 7.10.3.1 requires textual exit signs for all standard mounted applications; pictograms are allowed instead of or in addition to text if approved by local authorities and compliant with NFPA 170. The NFPA has also approved the ISO pictogram as an option for low-level glow-in-the-dark signs. New York City local law 26 requires these low-level pictograms in all high-rise buildings. In tunnels, the Transportation Research Board recommends the ISO symbol.

Newer Airbus, Bombardier CS100, and Boeing 787 Dreamliner planes use the new pictogram exit signs, which were approved by the FAA in 2012 and 2014 (depending on aircraft type). The renovated Government Center subway station in Boston, and the MBTA's newer Type 9 streetcars for the Green Line and new Orange Line and Red Line trains made by CRRC, use signs bearing "EXIT" in white on a green background beside the ISO pictogram. Recent terminal renovations at the Albany International Airport have added supplemental ISO pictogram exit signs on terminal way-finding signs near the emergency exits. Parts of the Corning Museum of Glass use an exclusive variant of the ISO pictogram, pointing to exits, along with textual signs. The Cherokee Nation's Durbin Feeling Language Center uses the ISO pictogram instead of text.

Modern exit signs often can be seen indicating the path to an exit in commercial and large residential buildings that comply with fire code. Certain circumstances, such as the year a building was built, or a sign that has a unique and historical design blended into its architecture, create exemptions from some of these codes (though in the latter case the lighting and backup lighting system behind the sign will likely be retrofitted to modern requirements). In most situations, the owner of the building is responsible for complying with exit-sign requirements. This is especially true in older buildings that serve as multiple residences, such as apartment buildings, hotels, and campus dormitories.

Modern fixtures are usually in a rugged plastic or metal housing securely bolted to the wall or ceiling. The signs have the word "EXIT", or a picture representing exit, on both sides. Single-sided signs are also available for wall-mount installations. The signs often have metal or plastic knock-outs which can optionally be removed so that an arrow is also lit pointing left or right. Modern exit signs are often combined with other safety devices, such as emergency floodlighting for supplementary area illumination. Modern exit signs are also, to some degree, flame retardant.

Exit signs draw a relatively small amount of power, and can generally be added onto any existing electrical circuit without adverse effects. In addition, specialized LED lamps with "candelabra" sized screw-in bases are available to replace the always-on incandescent lamps in older exit signs. This allows the existing fixtures to be easily upgraded to save energy, without the expense of complete replacement.

Most recently, Photoluminescent, Hybrid Photoluminescent and LEC (light emitting capacitor) exit signs have come to market. Photoluminescent signs consume no power and have an operational life of 30+ years. Hybrid Photoluminescent Exit Signs consume as little as 0.74 W of power. LEC signs are also called electroluminescent (EL), only consuming 1/4 W of power, and have an operational life of 30+ years which far exceeds the typical 10-year life of an LED sign.

=== Non-compliance with building codes ===
It is often a serious offence for a building owner or landlord to not comply with the fire/building code in terms of Exit signage. In July 2016, for example, a fire in a Toronto apartment caused the death of one person and injured many others. An investigation found that Emergency lights and Exit signs were not properly illuminated, and the landlord was fined $21,000 for "not properly illuminating exit signs and having no record of emergency lighting tests", and another $50,000 for other infractions to the code relating to fire doors.

== Lighting ==
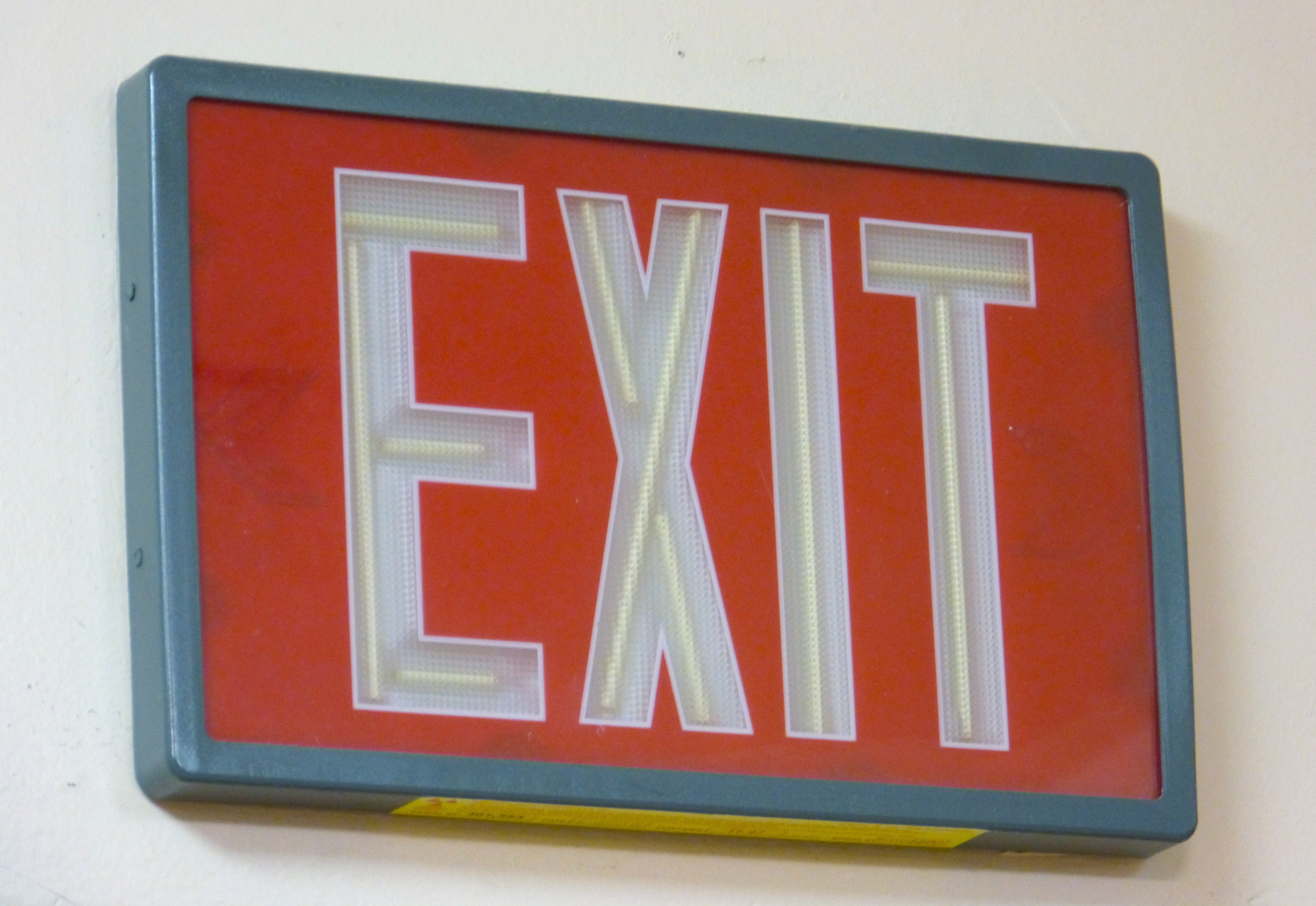
Sign illuminated by radioactive tritium

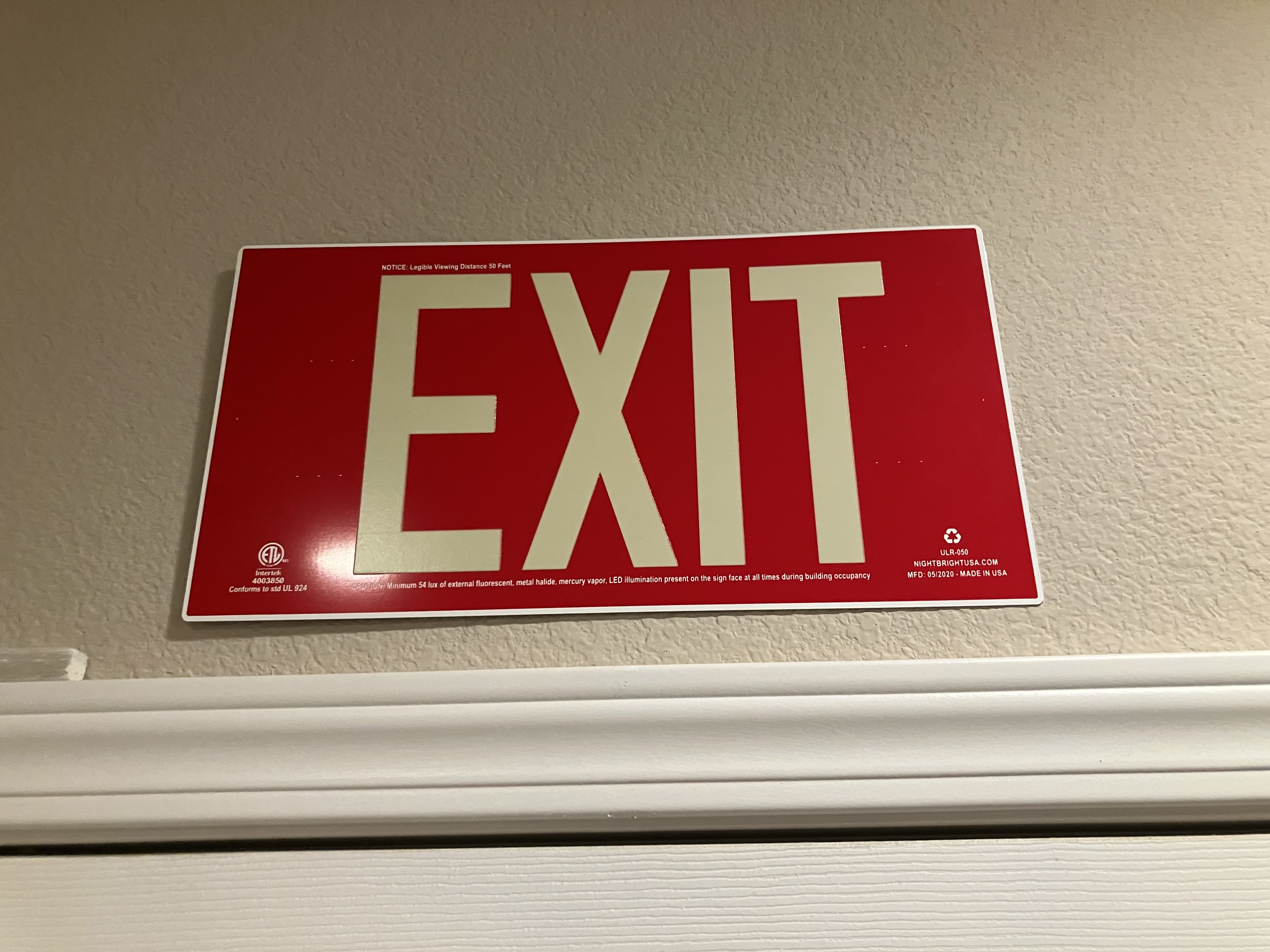
Photoluminescent (glow in the dark) Exit Sign

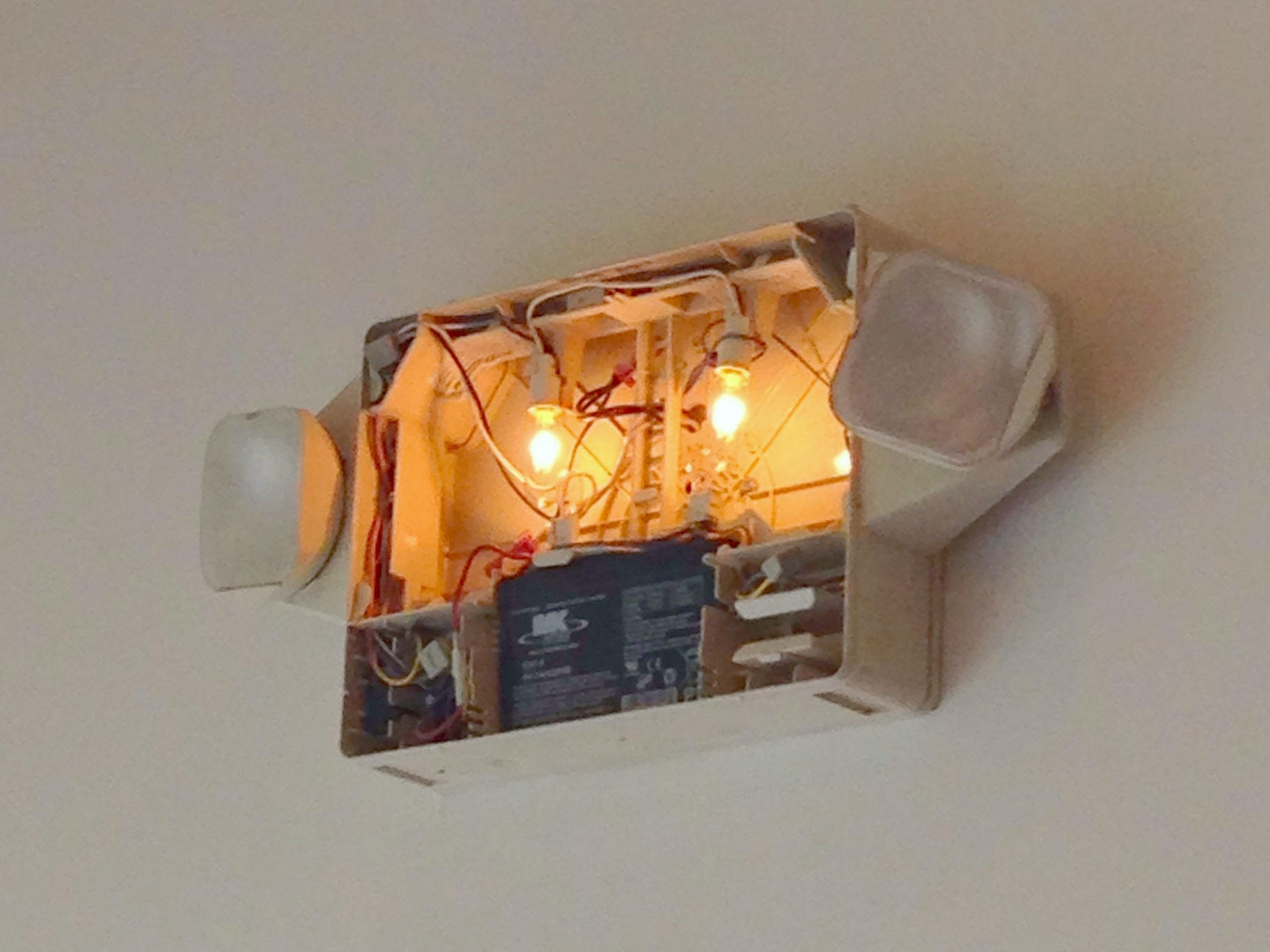
Inside of an emergency light/exit sign combination unit with light bulbs and backup battery

Since visibility may be reduced in a fire, due to smoke or failure of electric lighting, the sign is often permanently illuminated, usually by one of:

- Radio-luminescence (or "self-luminous") where a phosphor coating inside a glass tube glows due to the beta decay of radioactive tritium gas sealed into the tube. Radio-luminescent exit signs are prohibited in US Department of Defense installations.
- Photoluminescence (or "glow in the dark") use phosphorescence, where light absorbed earlier from the surroundings is slowly re-emitted
- Electric lighting, with a local rechargeable power source
- Electric lighting, with the building's emergency lighting circuits providing back-up power from a UPS or a generator in case normal power fails

== Color and design ==
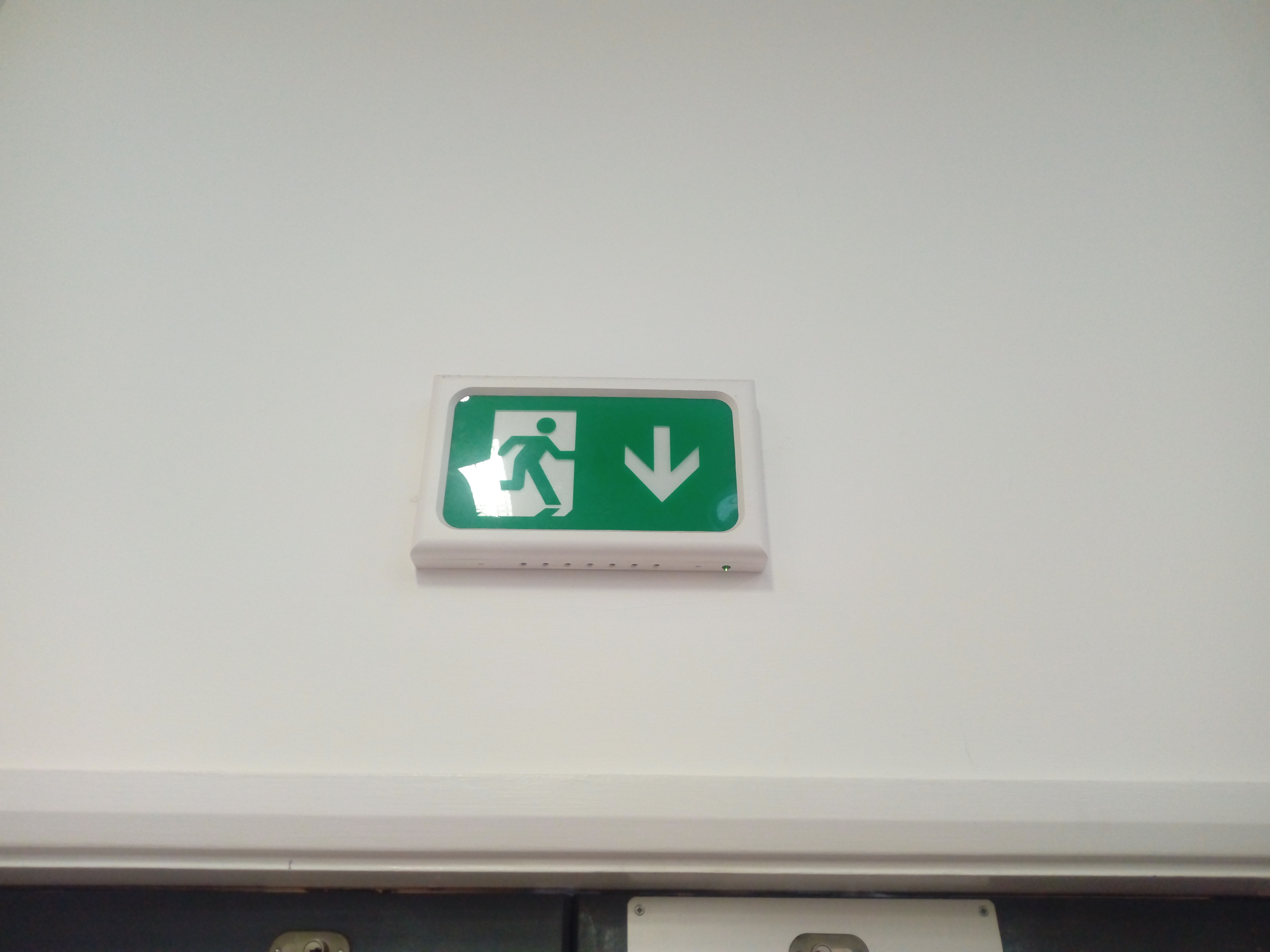
The UK variant of the emergency exit light sign

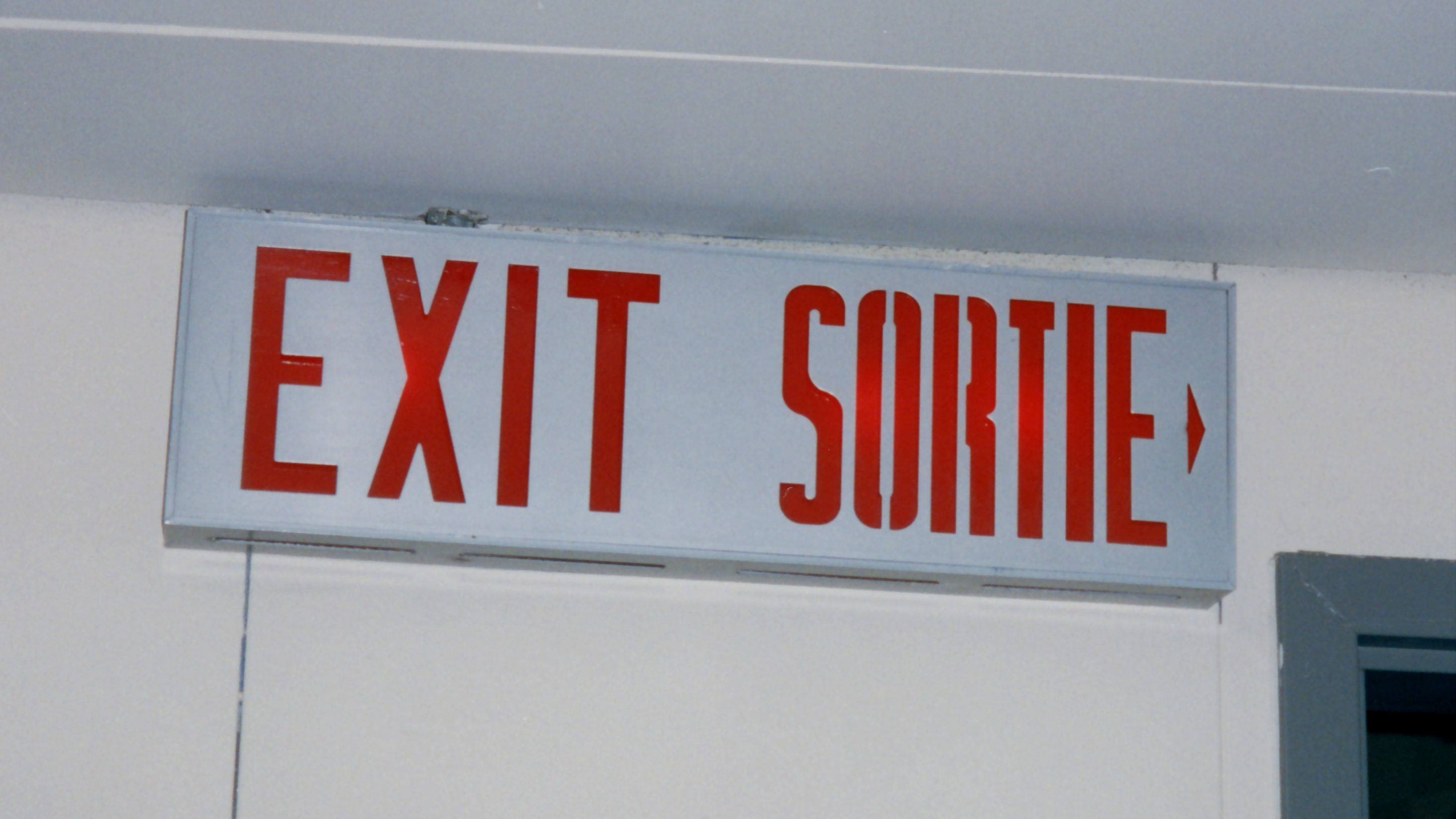
A bilingual EXIT sign was used at the CN Tower in Toronto until 2014, when it was replaced with the 'running man' pictogram, as with other Canadian exit signs

In most regions, including China, the European Union, Japan, and South Korea exit signs have green lettering. (In this color scheme, red is reserved to indicate prohibited activities.) In Australia, Canada, New Zealand, and most European countries, pictograms are used in place of the word "exit". European sign directive 92/58/EEC of 24 June 1992 indicates that the signs should be green in color to indicate a safe place of exit. BS EN 1838:1999 and BS 5266-7:1999 also govern emergency lighting applications.

In the United States, exit signs can be red or green, but traditionally they have been red. Many states or cities have enacted building codes that specify the sign color. For example, in Baltimore, Salt Lake City, and Portland, Oregon, green is required. New York City, Rhode Island, and Chicago (along with the rest of Illinois) require that exit signs be red.

New and renovated buildings in Canada are required to use the international standard green "running man" pictogram. The 1995 Canadian national building code required "red letters on a contrasting background or white letters on a red background ... spelling EXIT or SORTIE"; however, the 2010 Code calls for a switch from the red EXIT signs to the green "running-man" signs. The national building code informs provincial and municipal building codes but does not have legal status itself. Most Canadian jurisdictions require the international green "running-man" pictogram; however, some have allowed red "EXIT" signs to be maintained in older properties so long as one style is used consistently throughout the building.

Green fluorescent signs can be seen better in dark conditions than other colours, as the human rod cell is more sensitive to these wavelengths.

Newly installed exit signs in Australia and New Zealand are green with a white "running man" ISO 7010 figure. Previously, green-written 'EXIT' signs were standard.

== Accessible designs ==
There is a trend towards providing a more accessible, socially inclusive exit sign design based on universal design principles, including consideration for people with disabilities in the overall exit sign strategy for a building or facility.

The Accessible Exit Sign Project, which started in Australia in 2014 and has spread to New Zealand and the United States, is an international awareness campaign that promotes the need for an accessible means of egress. Advocates propose that appropriate exit signage to identify the accessible means of egress is a critical component to successful emergency planning for any building.

The proposed new exit sign design features an "Accessible Means of Egress Icon", which includes an adaptation of the "running man" symbol with a new wheelchair symbol. The design is considered an enhanced version of the ISO 7010 and ISO 21542 accessible exit sign that shows the "running man" and International Symbol of Access at the end of the sign. The universally inclusive design with the "running man" and "Accessible Means of Egress Icon" wheelchair symbol essentially share the same upper torso, and the design shows the two moving through the door together. The Global Alliance on Accessible Technologies and Environments (GAATES) has stated that the introduction of the "Accessible Means of Egress Icon" onto exit signage changes the current discriminatory approach to emergency exit signs and presents a fully inclusive design. "The combined ‘Running Man’ and ‘Accessible Means of Egress Icon’ […] are working together to escape the building. They move in unison, display the same urgency and motion and appear to be travelling at the same speed. Their heads are forward, showing their haste. Arms are extended and motioning back and forth as they move through the doorway."

The accessible exit signs are now being produced in Australia, New Zealand, United States, and United Kingdom, also featuring braille and tactile lettering suitable for people that have low vision or are blind. The design is intended to show where wheelchair accessible exit routes, evacuation lifts, evacuation devices and areas of refuge are located. The concept also provides more intuitive building design to assist people that are blind or have low vision to locate an exit. The design also meets the intent of the UN Convention on the Rights of Persons with Disabilities which requires signatory countries to consider the need for universal design in buildings.

== See also ==
- Emergency light
