= Emergency light =

Backup light source used in power outages

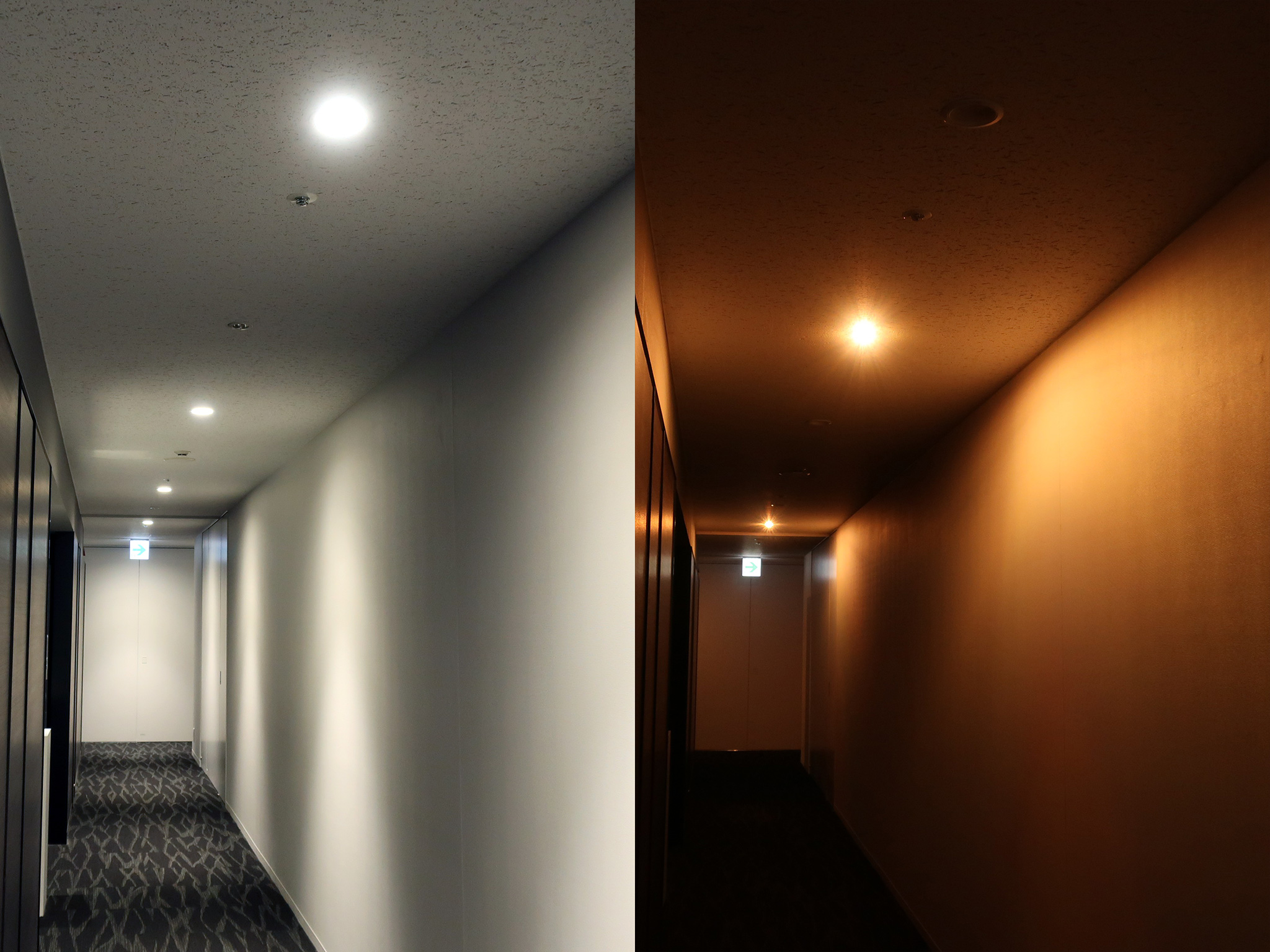
A hallway under regular lighting (left) and emergency lighting (right)

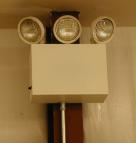
US-style emergency lighting fixture

An emergency light is a battery-backed lighting device that switches on automatically when a building experiences a power outage.

In the United States, emergency lights are standard in new commercial and high occupancy residential buildings, such as college dormitories, apartments, and hotels. Most building codes in the US require that they be installed in older buildings as well. Incandescent light bulbs were originally used in emergency lights, before fluorescent lights and later light-emitting diodes (LEDs) superseded them in the 21st century.

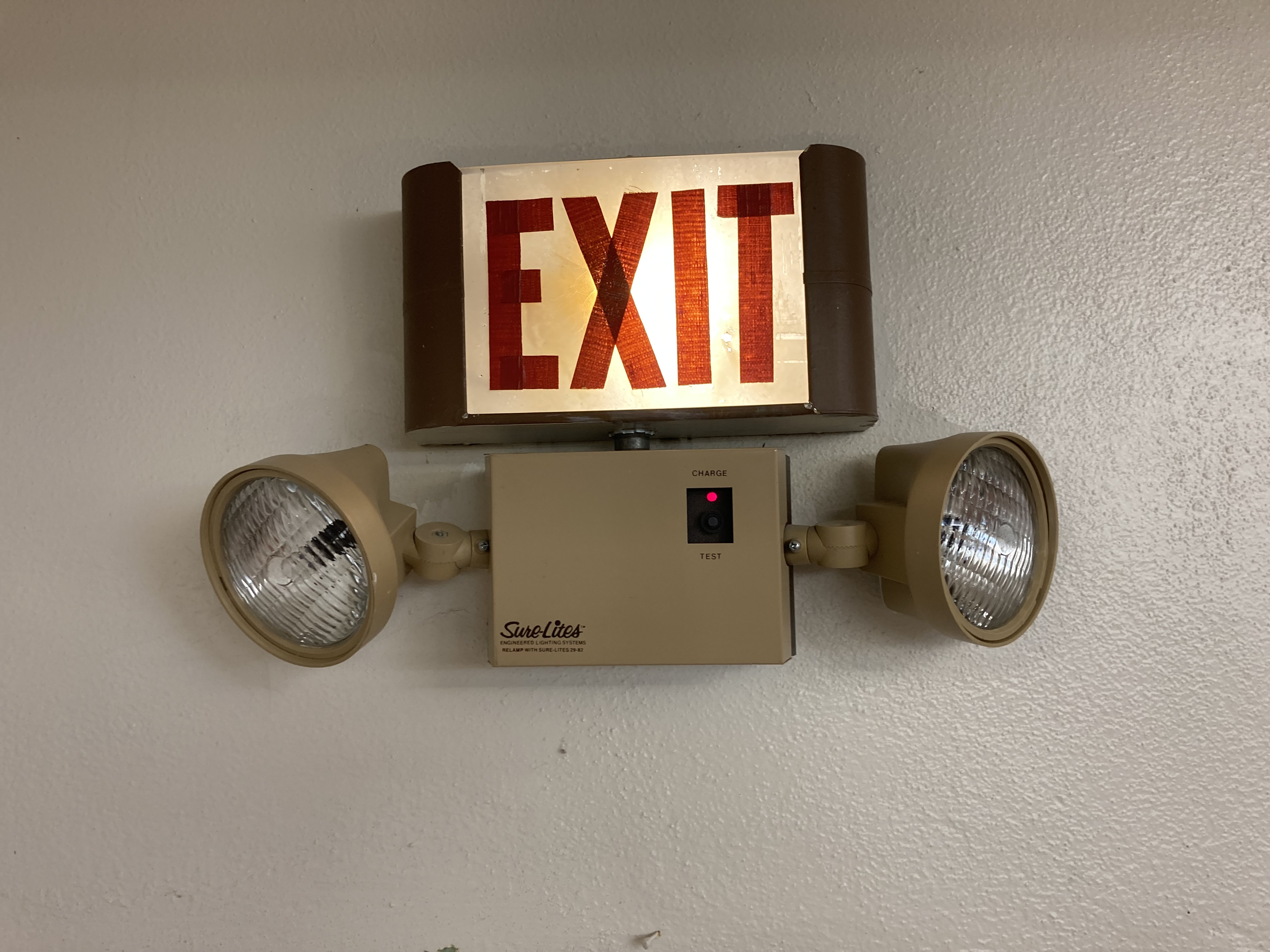
Sure-Lites emergency exit light

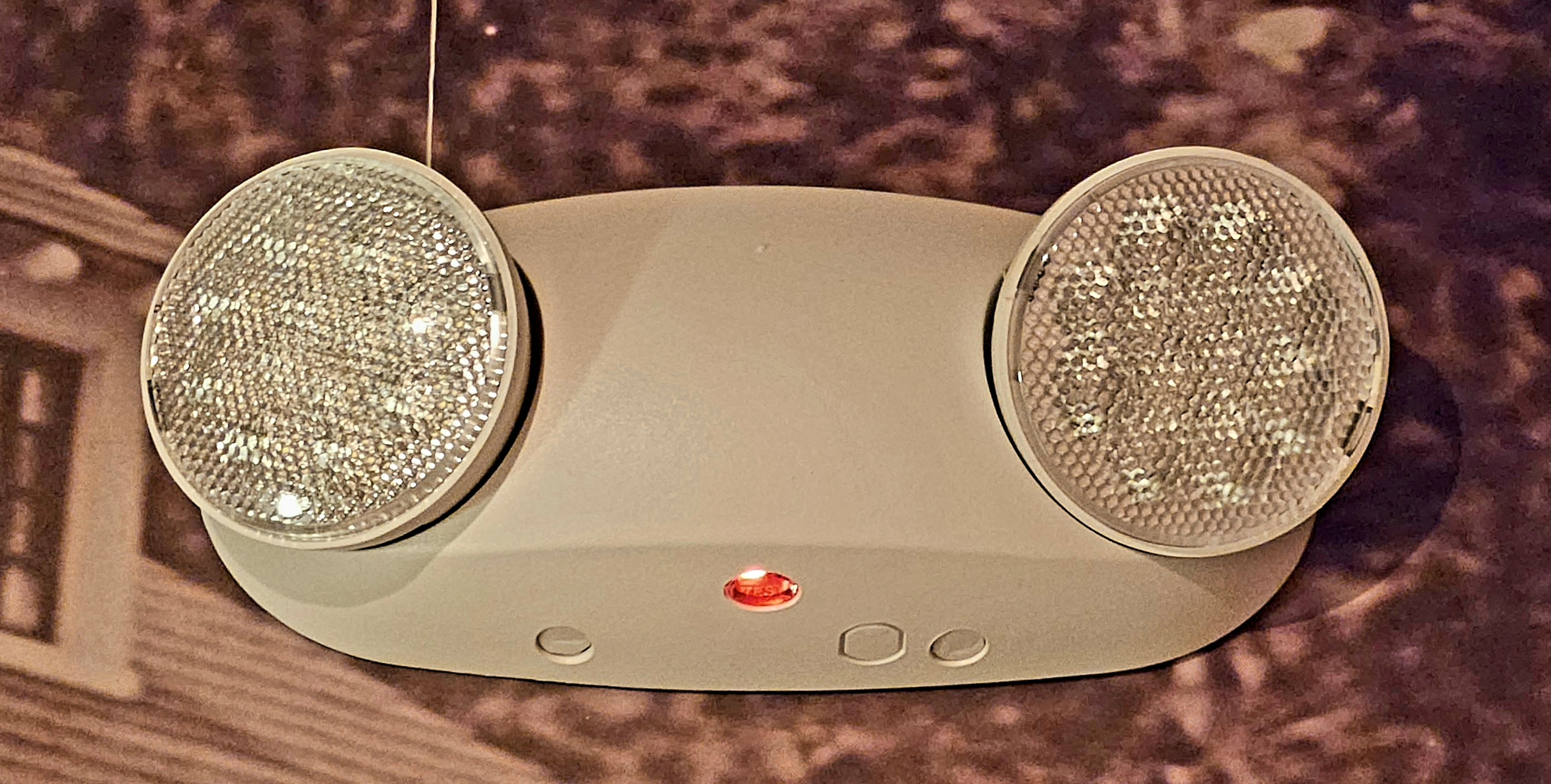
Emergency lights

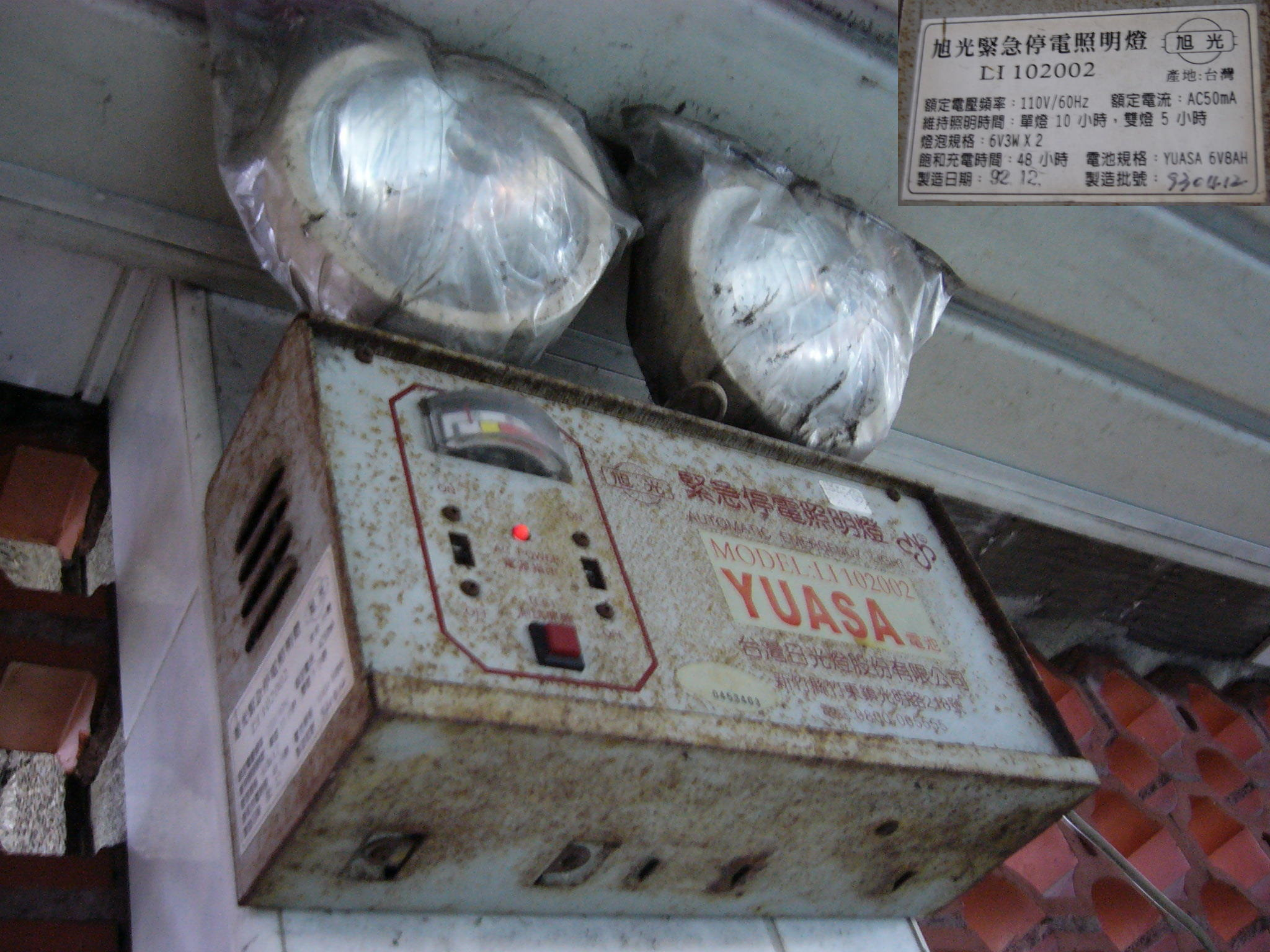
TFC automatic emergency light LI102002

== History ==
By the nature of the device, an emergency light is designed to come on when the power goes out. Every model, therefore, requires some sort of a battery or generator system that could provide electricity to the lights during a blackout. The earliest models were incandescent light bulbs which could dimly light an area during a blackout and perhaps provide enough light to solve the power problem or evacuate the building. It was quickly realized, however, that a more focused, brighter, and longer-lasting light was needed. Modern emergency floodlights provide a high-lumen, wide-coverage light that can illuminate an area quite well. Some lights are halogen, and provide a light source and intensity similar to that of an automobile headlight.

Early battery backup systems were huge, dwarfing the size of the lights for which they provided power. The systems normally used lead acid batteries to store a full 120 VDC charge. For comparison, an automobile uses a single lead acid battery as part of the ignition system. Simple transistor or relay technology was used to switch on the lights and battery supply in the event of a power failure. The size of these units, as well as the weight and cost, made them relatively rare installations. As technology developed further, the voltage requirements for lights dropped, and subsequently the size of the batteries was reduced as well. Modern lights are only as large as the bulbs themselves - the battery fits quite well in the base of the fixture.

== Modern installations ==
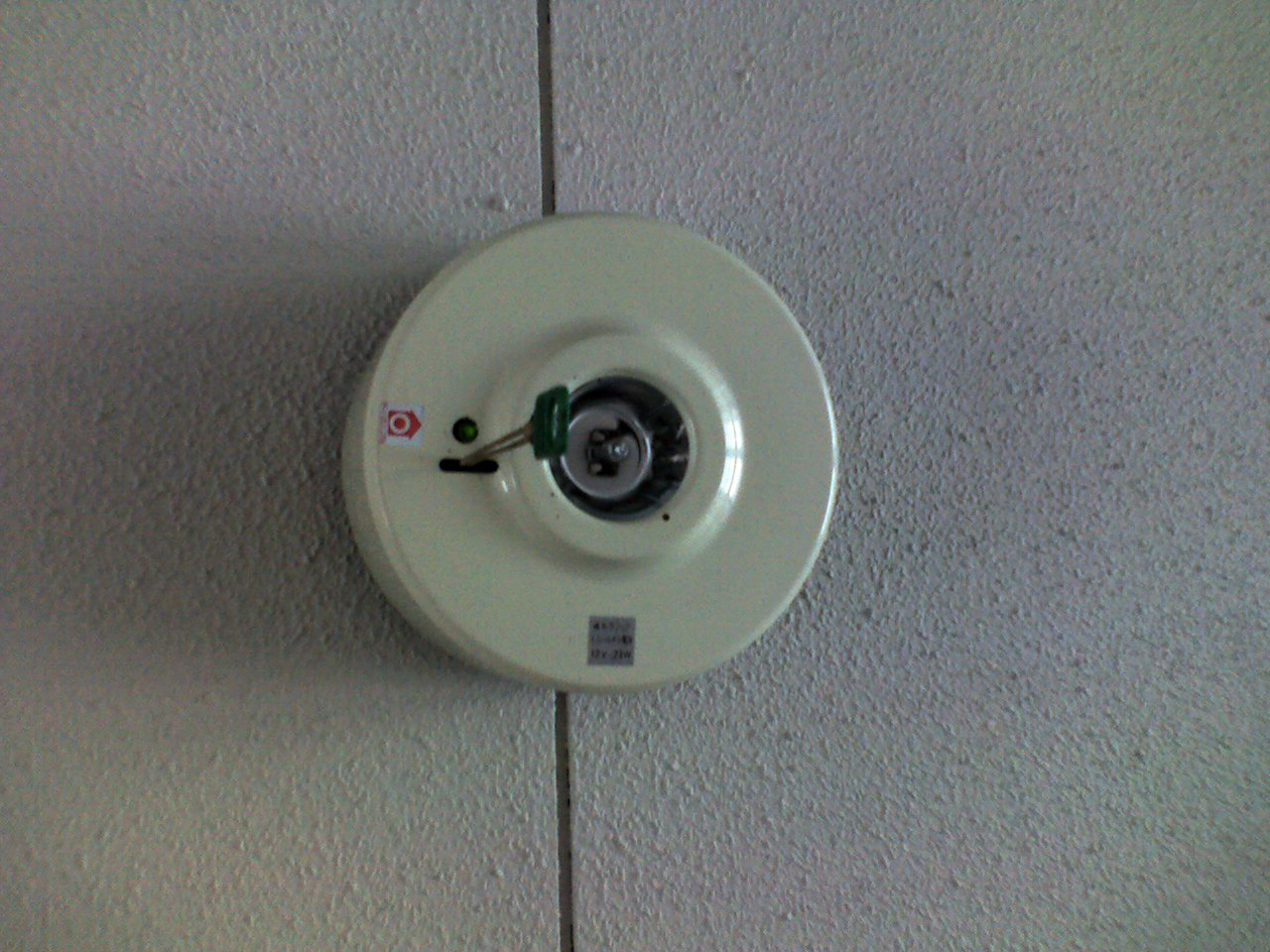
A small emergency light

In the United States, modern emergency lighting is installed in virtually every commercial and high occupancy residential building. The lights consist of one or more incandescent bulbs or one or more clusters of high-intensity light-emitting diodes (LED). The emergency lighting heads have usually been either incandescent PAR 36 sealed beams or wedge base lamps, but LED illumination is increasingly common. All units have some sort of a device to focus and intensify the light they produce. This can either be in the form of a plastic cover over the fixture, or a reflector placed behind the light source. Most individual light sources can be rotated and aimed for where light is needed most in an emergency, such as toward fire exits.

Modern fixtures usually have a test button of some sort which simulates a power failure and causes the unit to switch on the lights and operate from battery power, even if the main power is still on. Modern systems are operated with relatively low voltage, usually from 6-12 VDC. This both reduces the size of the batteries required and reduces the load on the circuit to which the emergency light is wired. Modern fixtures include a small transformer in the base of the fixture which steps-down the voltage from main current to the low voltage required by the lights. Batteries are commonly made of lead-calcium, and can last for 10 years or more on continuous charge. US fire safety codes require a minimum of 90 minutes on battery power during a power outage along the path of egress.

== Compliance codes ==
New York City requires emergency lights to carry a Calendar Number signifying approval for local installation, Chicago requires emergency lighting to have a metal face plate, and Los Angeles requires additional exit signs be installed within 18 inches (460 mm) of the floor around doors to mark exits during a fire, as smoke rises and tends to block out higher installed units.

As there are strict requirements to provide an average of one foot candle of light along the path of egress, emergency lighting should be selected carefully to ensure codes are met.

In recent years, emergency lighting has made less use of the traditional two-head unit - with manufacturers stretching the concept of emergency lighting to accommodate and integrate emergency lighting into the architecture.

An emergency lighting installation may be either a central standby source such as a bank of lead acid batteries and control gear/chargers supplying slave fittings throughout the building, or may be constructed using self-contained emergency fittings which incorporate the lamp, battery, charger and control equipment.

Self-contained emergency lighting fittings may operate in "Maintained" mode (illuminated all the time or controlled by a switch) or "Non-Maintained" mode (illuminated only when the normal supply fails).

Some emergency lighting manufacturers offer dimming solutions for common area emergency lighting to allow energy savings for building owners when unoccupied using embedded sensors.

Another popular method for lighting designers, architects and contractors are battery backup ballasts that install within or adjacent to existing lighting fixtures. Upon sensing power loss, the ballasts switch into emergency mode turning the existing lighting into emergency lighting in order to meet both the NFPA's Life Safety Code and the National Electrical Code without the need of wiring separate circuits or external wall mounts.

Codes of practice for remote mounted emergency lighting generally mandate that wiring from the central power source to emergency luminaires be kept segregated from other wiring, and constructed in fire resistant cabling and wiring systems.

Codes of practice lay down minimum illumination levels in escape routes and open areas. Codes of practice also lay down requirements governing siting of emergency lighting fittings, for example the UK code of practice, BS5266, specifies that a fitting must be within 2 metres (6 ft 7 in) horizontal distance of a fire alarm call point or location for fire fighting appliances.

The most recent codes of practice require the designer to allow for both failure of the supply to the building and the failure of an individual lighting circuit. BS5266 requires that when Non Maintained fittings are used, they must be supplied from the same final circuit as the main lighting circuit in the area.

== UK specific information ==
Emergency lights test, or emergency lighting compliance (ELC), is the process of ensuring that emergency lights are in working order and compliant with safety regulations. This typically involves monthly and annual tests, as well as regular maintenance and replacement of batteries and bulbs. emergency lights test is important to ensure that emergency lights will be able to provide adequate illumination in the event of a power outage or other emergency situation.

According to British fire safety law, an entire assessment of the system must be conducted yearly and “flick-tested” at least once a month. Emergency lighting serves multiple purposes: illuminating pathways for occupants to escape from hazardous situations, as well as helping individuals discover nearby fire-fighting equipment in case of emergencies.

== Types ==
For UK and Australian regulations, two types are distinguished:

- Maintained luminaires are permanently illuminated, and remain illuminated when power fails. They are used for tasks such as emergency exit lighting. In some cases they may be switched off deliberately, but are usually required to be active when a building is occupied, or when the public are admitted, such as for a theatre.
- Sustained or non-maintained luminaires may be switched on and off normally. If the power fails, they turn on automatically.

== Standards ==
IEC 60598-2-22 Ed. 3.0: Luminaires - Part 2-22: Particular requirements - Luminaires for emergency lighting

IEC 60364-5-56 Ed. 2.0: Low-voltage electrical installations - Part 5-56: Selection and erection of electrical equipment - Safety services

ISO 30061:2007 (CIE S 020/E:2007): Emergency lighting (specifies the luminous requirements for emergency lighting systems)

== See also ==
- Lightstick
- Exit sign
