= Yukio Ota =

Japanese graphic designer (1939–2026)

- Born: 1939
- Died: 18 August 2026 (aged 86)
- Education: Tama Art University
- Occupation: Graphic designer

Yukio Ota (太田幸夫, Ōta Yukio; 1939 – 18 August 2026) was a Japanese graphic designer best known for his work on the ISO 7010 exit sign and the pictorial language LoCoS.

== Life and career ==
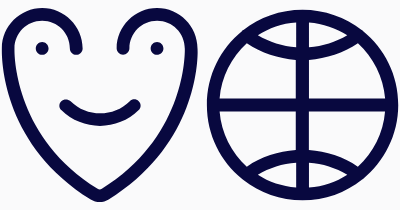
LoCoS

Exit sign

Yukio Ota was born in 1939.

He graduated from the Tama Art University in 1962.

He went on to develop the pictorial language LoCoS starting in 1964, before starting work at Tokyo Zokei University in 1967. In 1979, he created the "running man" exit sign for a competition held by a Japanese fire safety association, which was eventually adapted as a part of the ISO 7010 standard in 1985 or 1987. He also worked at Tama Art University from 1985, where he became a professor. As of 2020, he served as a director of the Japan Society for Science of Signs.

Ota died from pneumonia on 18 August 2026, at the age of 86.

== Works ==
- LoCoS (1964)
- Ministry of Economy, Trade and Industry logo (1975)
- ISO Standard exit sign (1979)
