= LoCoS =

Pictorial language

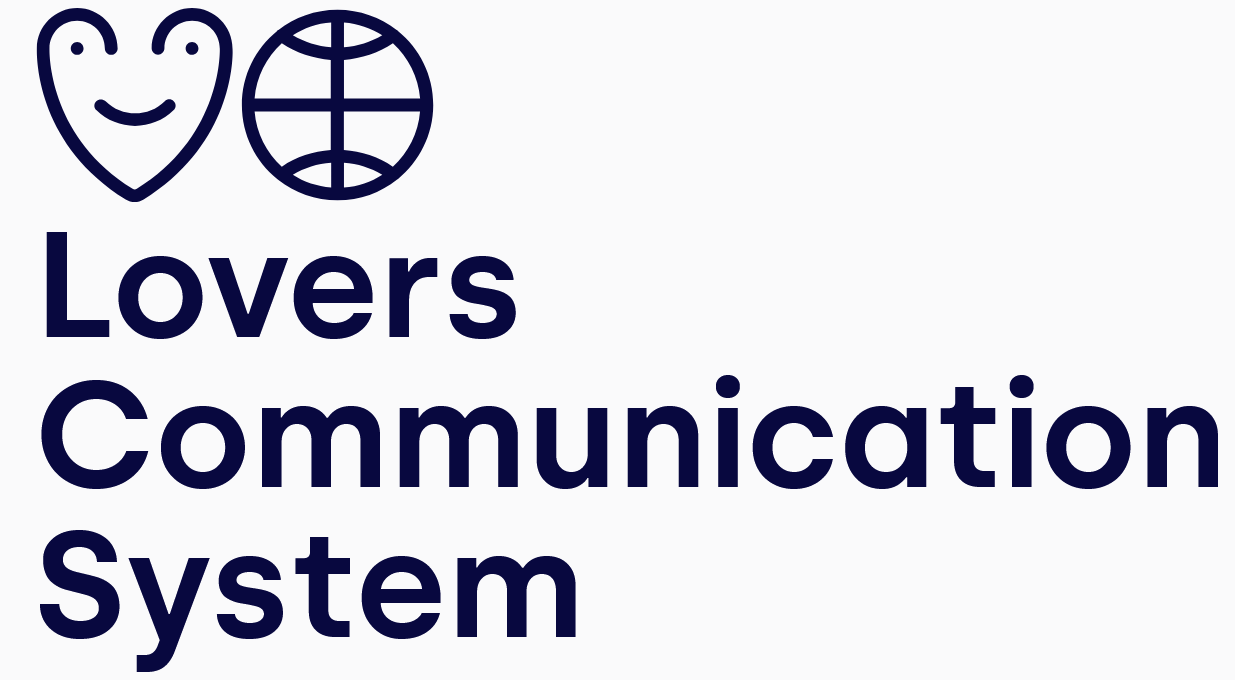
- Script type: Ideographic
- Creator: Yukio Ota
- Created: 1964
- Direction: Left-to-right
- Languages: LoCoS

LoCoS
- Lovers Communication System
- Created by: Yukio Ota
- Date: 1964
- Purpose: Constructed language: International auxiliary language; Pasigraphy; LoCoS

Language codes
- ISO 639-3: –

LoCoS (short for Lovers Communication System) is a pictorial language developed by Yukio Ota of Japan in 1964. It was meant as communication for the deaf and mute as well as for the illiterate. It is a universal and simple language, and as Ota put it, "It should emphasize the importance of communication among all the people of all the countries of the world."

== Symbols ==
There are eight major symbols in LoCoS.

Symbol	Description
Hollow circle	sun, day
Hollow circle with a gap at the top	man, person
Hollow square	thing
Hollow triangle with a gap at the top	thought
Hollow heart shape with a gap between the two lobes at the top	feeling
Low straight line	place, land
Question mark	question
Dot	existence

== Words ==
Words are made by combining different symbols in different ways. For example if you put a dot inside a circle it will represent today, or if you put a fish in an open ring shape it will be a fisherman.

today

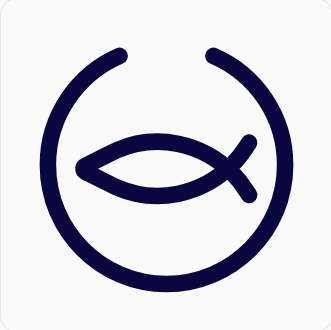
fisherman

There are around 80 words that are official according to Yukio Ota. Words can be created as long as they follow the basic word syntax.

emotion

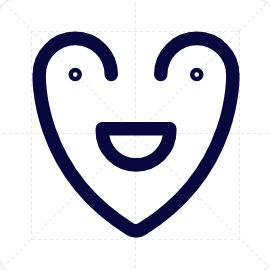
laugh

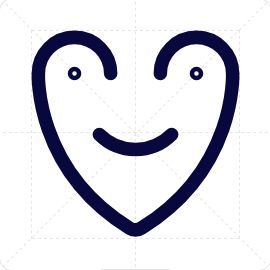
happy

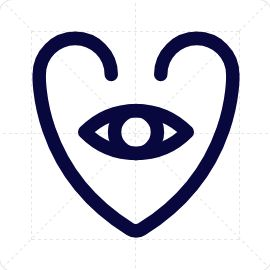
attention

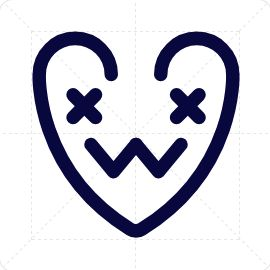
fear

== Sentences ==
It's very good to meet you.

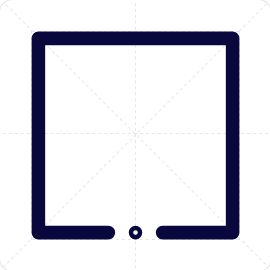
it

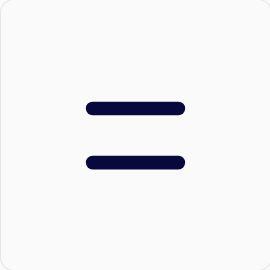
is

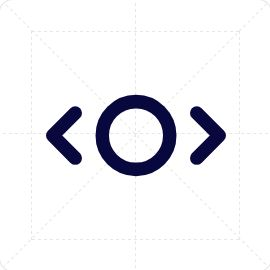
very good

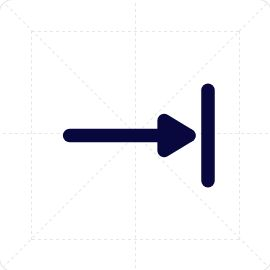
to

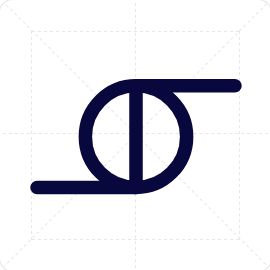
meet

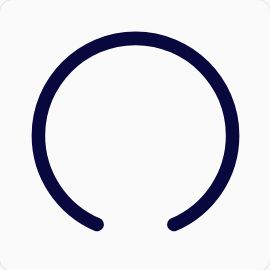
you

It's sad you can't stay any longer.

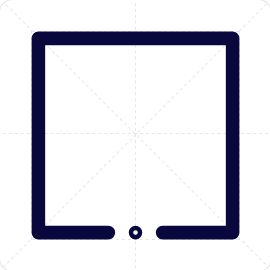
it

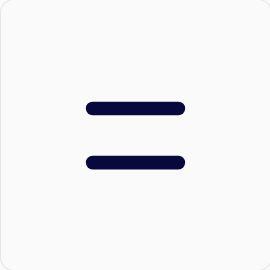
is

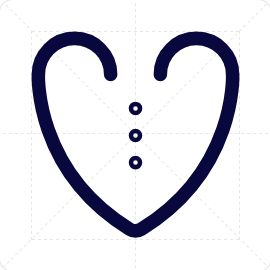
sad

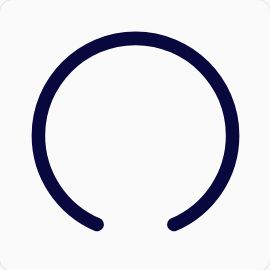
you

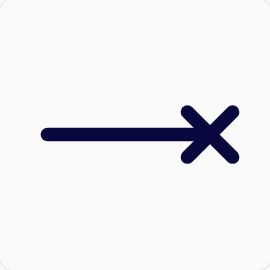
cannot

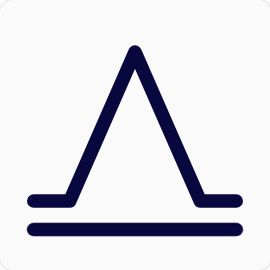
stay

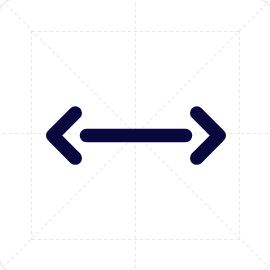
long

But this short stay was very interesting.

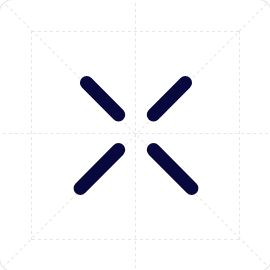
but

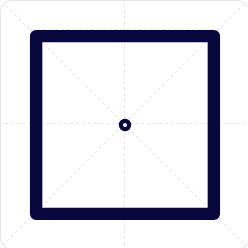
this

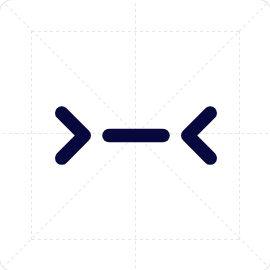
short

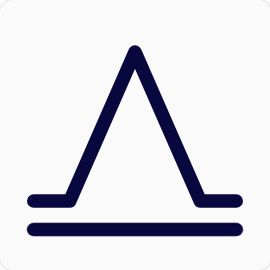
stay

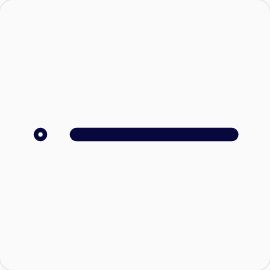
(past)

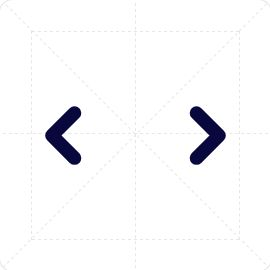
very

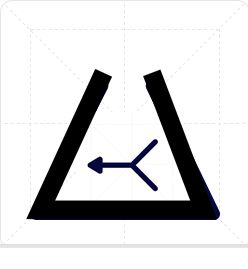
interesting

We learnt lots from you.

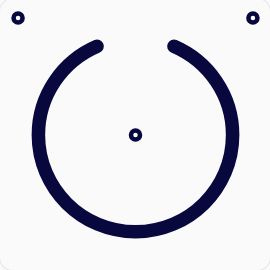
we

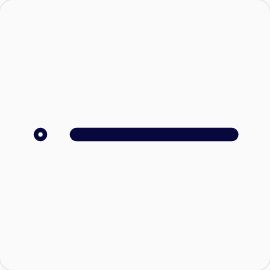
(past)

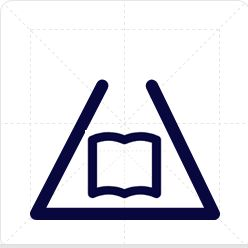
learn

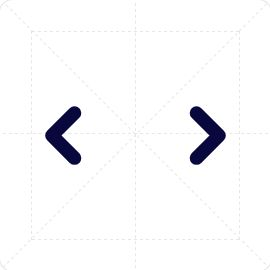
a lot

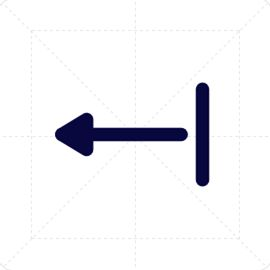
from

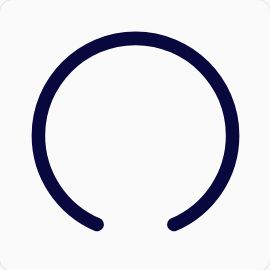
you

Hope you were happy.

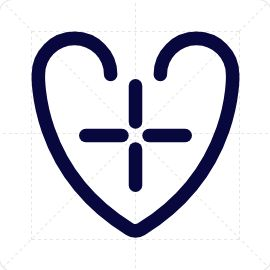
hope

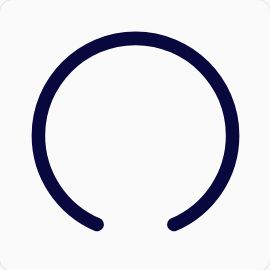
you

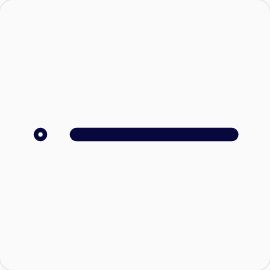
(past)

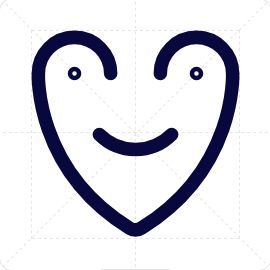
happy

We hope you'll succeed.

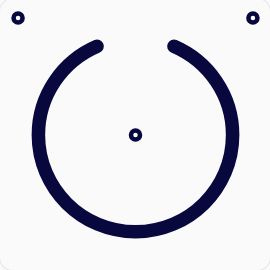
we

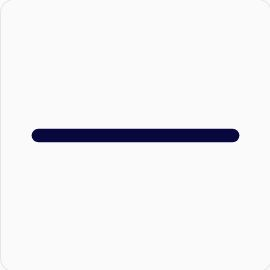
(present)

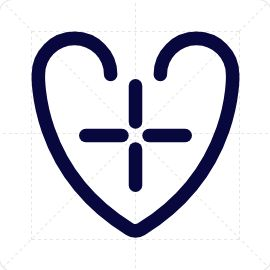
hope

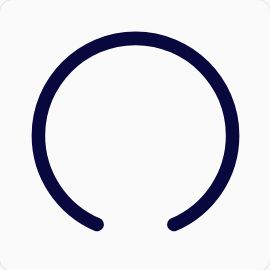
you

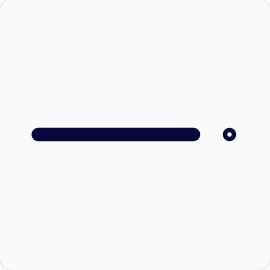
(future)

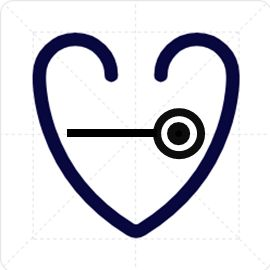
succeed

Hope to see you.

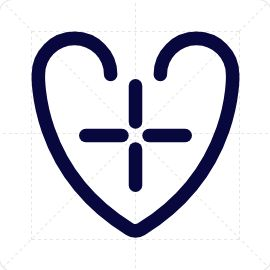
hope

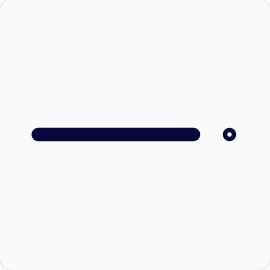
(future)

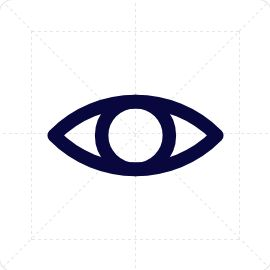
see

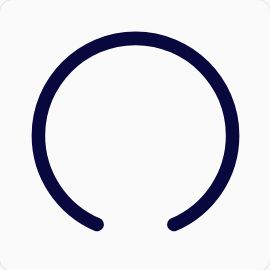
you

Love you lots.

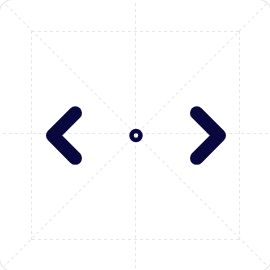
lot

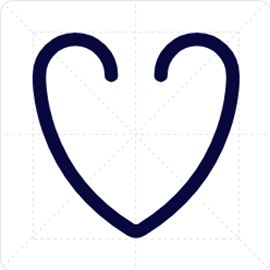
love

== Bibliography ==
- Bliss, C.K. (1965). Semantography (Blissymbolics). Sydney, Australia: Semantography Publications, second edition, 882 pp. The book presents a system for universal writing, or pasigraphy.
- Ota, Yukio (1973). «LoCoS: An Experimental Pictorial Language.» Icographic, No. 6, pp. 15–19. Published by ICOGRADA, the International Council of Graphic Design Associations, based in London.
- Ota, Yukio (1987). Pictogram Design, Kashiwashobo, Tokyo, ISBN 4-7601-0300-7, 1987. The author presents a world-wide collection of case studies in visible language signage systems, including LoCoS.
