= Global Alliance on Accessible Technologies and Environments =

The Global Alliance on Accessible Technologies and Environments (GAATES) (2007) is an international not-for-profit organization (registered in Canada) that promotes accessibility of technologies and the built environment, and the principles of the Convention on the Rights of Persons with Disabilities. Its areas of interest include architecture, infrastructural design, transportation systems, habitat, and electronic information and communication technologies (ICT). It aims to enable people with disabilities and older persons to fully participate and contribute to society.

GAATES obtained consultative status with the United Nations Economic and Social Council (ECOSOC) and UN Department of Economic and Social Affairs (DESA) in 2008. GAATES has a collaborative and working relationship with a number of international organizations including the United Nations Educational, Scientific and Cultural Organization (UNESCO), the UN Department of Economic and Social Affairs (UNDESA), the United Nations Economic and Social Committee for Asia Pacific (UNESCAP), United Nations Children's Fund (UNICEF) the International Telecommunication Union (ITU), the World Summit on the Information Society (WSIS).

Board of directors (2014)

- President: Mukhtar Al Shibani (Saudi Arabia)
- 1st vice president: Aqeel Qureshi (India/Japan)
- 2nd vice president: Ann Frye (UK)
- Treasurer: Bob Topping (Canada)
- Secretary: Charles Letourneau (Canada)
- Past-president: Betty Dion (Canada)
- Honorary counsel: Ernie Tannis (Canada)
- Honorary chairperson: Her Highness Sheikha Jameela Bint Mohammed Al Qassimi

Board members

- Ahmed El Rida (Libya)
- Ilene R. Zeitzer Brazil
- Jorge Plano (Argentina)
- Tim Springer (United States)
- Joseph Kwan (Hong Kong/China)
- Axel Leblois (France)
- Eoin O'Herlihy (Ireland)
- Tom Rickert (United States)
- Victor Pineda (United States)
- Pramudhi Rumeeshika (Sri Lanka)
