= Autism-friendly =

Being aware of factors affecting autistic people

Autism-friendly means being aware of social engagement and environmental factors affecting autistic people, with modifications to communication methods and physical space to better suit individuals' unique needs.

== Overview ==
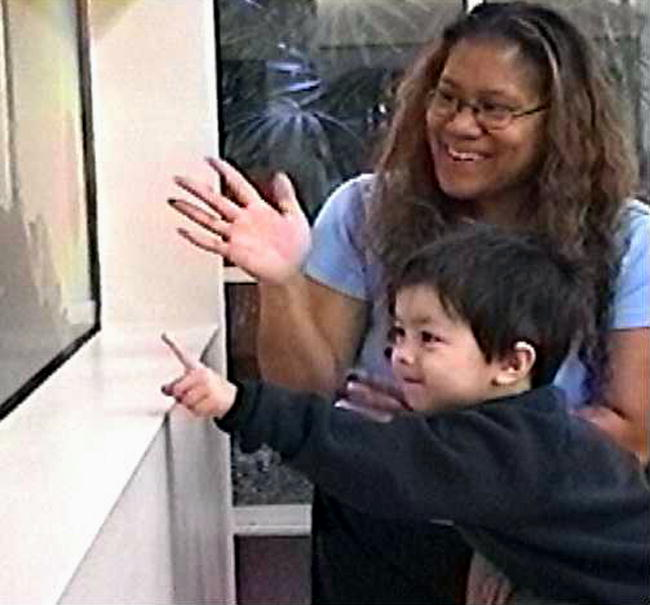
"Opening a window to the autistic brain." An autistic three-year-old pointing to the fish in an aquarium.

Autistic individuals receive sensory information in the same way as non-autistic individuals, but process it differently. This difference in processing can lead to sensory overload, causing them to become overwhelmed by the amount of information they receive and withdraw as a coping mechanism. Additionally, it may be that an autistic person is actually taking in more sensory information and is merely overwhelmed by the sheer amount of input. As such, they may experience difficulty in public settings due to inhibited communication, social interaction or flexibility of thought development. Knowing about these differences and how to react effectively helps to create a more inclusive society. It also better suits the needs of autistic individuals.

Being autism friendly means being understanding and flexible in interpersonal conversation, public programs and public settings. For example, a person might think that someone is being rude if they will not look them in the eyes or does not understand figurative expressions of language like "it's a piece of cake", when in fact there may be a reason for this. Depending upon the individual's degree of language ability, a person who hears "it's a piece of cake" may take that literally and not understand that what is really meant is "it will be easy". For autistic people, being in an autism-friendly environment means they will have a manageable degree of sensory stimuli, which will make them calmer, better able to process the sensory stimulation they receive, and better able to relate to others.

=== Environment ===
Some autistic people may be hypersensitive to changes in sight, touch, smell, taste and sound; the sensory stimulus could be very distracting or they could result in pain or anxiety. There are other people who are hyposensitive and may not feel extreme changes in temperature or pain. Each of these has implications for making an autism-friendly environment.

==== Social factors ====
There are several factors in creating a supportive environment. One of them is adherence to a standard routine and structure. Since change of routine can be quite anxiety-producing for many autistic people, a structured, predictable routine makes for calmer and happier transitions during the day. Another important factor is creating a low-arousal space. Environments with the least amount of disruption will help autistic people remain calm. It is important to speak in quiet, non-disruptive tones and to use a physical space that has a low level of disruption. Having a positive, empathetic attitude and ensuring consistent habits in work, school and recreational activities also help to minimize anxiety and distress and help an autistic person succeed. This is the SPELL approach: Structure – Positive – Empathy – Low arousal – Links. Social Stories can be used to communicate ways in which an autistic person can prepare themselves for social interaction.

==== Physical space ====
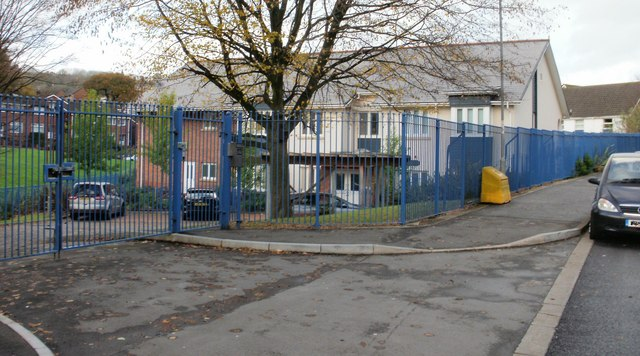
Newport Ty Nant uses modern SMART technology, autism-friendly design features and an autism-specific model of care to allow tenants to have more control over their lives.

There are several ways that the physical space can be designed and organized to be autism friendly. It is important for rooms to be decorated with serenity in mind, like painting the walls with calming colors. Thick carpeting and double-paned glass help to minimize distracting noise (e.g., noise pollution). Materials within the rooms may be organized, grouped and labeled with words or symbols to make items easier to locate. Where it is impracticable for physical spaces to be altered, tools such as Tesco Mobile's Sensory Support Boxes can be borrowed by people with heightened sensory perception to make them more tolerable.

== Topics ==
=== Daily life ===
Autism friendliness can have a significant impact on an individual's interpersonal life and work life, benefited by consistency across all areas of one's life.

==== Vacations ====
As the break of routine in family vacations causes distress to some autistic people, many families may avoid taking vacations. Steps can be taken to help make for a successful family vacation. One is sharing information like pictures or internet web pages. There are organizations that will make accommodations, if requested, to better manage common stressors such as uncertainty, crowds and noise disruption. This includes theme parks that allow autistic people to skip long lines and airlines or airports that may allow for a dry-run prior to the trip. Another tip is to prepare prior to the trip so that there is a plan for managing boredom.

=== Entertainment ===
==== Theatre ====
In the United States, the Theatre Development Fund (TDF) created a program in 2011 to "make theatre accessible to children and adults on the autism spectrum". Called the Autism Theatre Initiative, it is part of their Accessibility Programs, and was done in conjunction with Autism Speaks, Disney and experts who reviewed the performance for areas of modification. Adjustments that have been named for the initiative include: quiet areas in theatre lobby, performance changes that reduced strobe light use and noise, and areas where people can go perform an activity if they leave the theatre. Social Stories, which explain what the experience will be like (such as loud noises, needing a break and moving through a crowd), were made available prior to the performance. These performances included The Lion King and Mary Poppins.

On London's West End theatre was the premiere of the first autism-friendly performance of Wicked, on 14 May 2016.

==== Movie cinema ====
Going to a movie theater can be an overwhelming experience for some autistic people. Crowding as people queue up to buy tickets, loud movie volume, and dark theater lighting can all be sensory overload triggers that keep some autistic people from ever seeing movies at the cinema. Some movie theaters are becoming more autism-friendly: the lighting is adjusted so it is not so dark, the volume is reduced and queues are managed to prevent crowding. In August 2011, non-profit organisation Dimensions UK partnered with cinemas across the United Kingdom and the Republic of Ireland to host autism-friendly screenings. They have partnered with over 300 cinemas, including cinemas from chains such as Odeon Cinemas, Cineworld, Showcase Cinemas, and Vue International. Adjustments include reduced sound, dimmed lighting, and omitted trailers, and attendees are permitted to bring their own food, make noise, or move around the cinema.

In the United States there are also "sensory-friendly" moviegoing experiences to be had through collaboration with the Autism Society of America. Monthly, AMC Theatres (AMC) will provide nights when autistic people and their families may experience an autism-friendly movie night. The program is also intended for other disabled people whose moviegoing experience will also be improved in such a setting.

==== Santa Claus ====
In Canada, malls operated by Oxford Properties established a process by which autistic children could visit Santa Claus at the mall without having to contend with crowds. The malls open early to allow entry only to families with autistic children, who have a private visit with Santa Claus. In 2012, the Southcentre Mall in Calgary was the first mall to offer this service. The children are given a booklet explaining the process, and upon arrival at the mall are placed in a waiting area near Santa Claus before their visit "to ensure their comfort".

=== Education ===
Providing the best outcomes for an autistic child may be difficult, complicated by each child's unique way of managing communication and interaction with others, associated disorders that make each child's situation unique, and emerging understandings of neurodiversity. Teacher effectiveness can be optimized based upon their awareness of the differences amongst autistic people, acceptance that each child is unique, engagement of the child in social and educational activities and employment of teaching methods that are found to be helpful to developmentally disabled people.

Teachers play a key role in the success of an autistic student by helping them to understand directions, organize tasks and support their achievements. One example is organizing and grouping materials together for activities in specific ways.

Teachers give autistic students extra time to answer when they ask them a question. Autistic children take time to process information but they are listening and will respond.

Schools dedicated to being autism friendly, like Pathlight School in Singapore, designed their campus to offer students "dignity" in an autism-friendly environment. There the campus was architecturally designed, landscaped and the interior created with a simple color scheme. All of this helps to avoid triggering sensory overload. There is a high teacher to student ratio, a focus on nurturing, and a comprehensive life-skills training and education program.

==== Empathising–systemising theory ====
Empathising–systemising theory with video technology can be used to present information in an autism-friendly way that promotes understanding. For instance, computer applications or DVDs of actors making facial expressions to inform how body language provides clues about how someone might be feeling. Or, in the case of The Transporters, interesting items like trains are used to wear faces, drawing in the viewer into the faces.

=== Justice and law ===
Being met with an individual in a dark uniform can be intimidating to an autistic person, particularly when they have been a crime victim or are injured. Police and emergency responders may become frustrated, not knowing a person that they are talking to is autistic. The responders may not be communicating in a way that will create understanding and make the situation less stressful. A program has been launched in London, Ontario, Canada to enter information into a database about autistic people so that responding police and emergency personnel are notified when they will be meeting an autistic person and may then communicate in a way that increases understanding and makes the situation less stressful. Autism Alert Cards, for example, are available for autistic people in London, England, UK so that police and emergency personnel will recognize autistic individuals and respond appropriately. The cards, which encourage autism-friendly interaction, have a couple of key points about interacting with autistic people.

=== Life events ===
Neurotypical people and autistic people may have very different ways of communicating their feelings about life events, including:

- Coping with illness, injury and recuperation
- Dealing with dying and death
- Incorporating rituals and traditions for managing life events
- Managing emotions
- Learning from life events

The ways autistic people process and express thoughts and feelings are varied, differing both from person to person and on average compared to non-autistic individuals. Honesty and directness are typically highly valued. In case of a disruptive life event, it is recommended to provide relevant information and allow the person time to process it. Other communication tools may also help the person to process and manage the event.

Autistic people can help themselves manage situations by being aware of what they are feeling and thinking — and expressing their thoughts to important people in their life. Other tools are being aware of when they need help and asking for it — and thanking people when they have received assistance or a gift.

=== Technology ===
Educational technological applications for people with autism include:

==== Digital talking books ====
Digital talking books are used to assist disabled people, commonly people who are blind, and also for autistic people. One such use is for taped church programs.

==== Mobile applications ====
- One of the providers of autism-friendly applications is iPad, which was an interface between the child and the storyteller on a video. By repeating what the narrator says, the children hear themselves tell the story, like Tom the Talking Cat. Reading the stories aloud helps children improve their language and communication skills, as well as improving fine motor skills, social skills and sensory skills.
- Apple iPod applications can be used by autistic people to manage tasks at work. It can manage a checklist of tasks and reminder prompts. This helps a person be more calm and effective and rely less on managers or job coaches to prompt for needed work. Tony Gentry, who led research on the application at Virginia Commonwealth University said: "This is an exciting time for anyone in the fields of education, physical rehabilitation, and vocational support, where we are seeing a long-awaited merging of consumer products and assistive technologies for all."

==== Types of technology ====
- Emotion Markup Language is a general-purpose emotion annotation and representation language, which should be usable in a large variety of technological contexts where emotions need to be represented. Emotion-oriented computing (or "affective computing") is gaining importance as interactive technological systems become more sophisticated. For autistic people, it can be used to make the emotional intent of content explicit. This would enable people with learning disabilities to realize the emotional context of the content.

=== Training for businesses ===
Tesco, a multinational supermarket chain, has implemented training for its employees to meet the needs of its autistic customers, who are estimated to be one of every 100 people in the United Kingdom. Employees use an online training site and respond to a questionnaire to assess the extent to which they became more aware of autism spectrum disorders (ASD). Tesco is the first company to participate in an awareness program led by the Welsh Local Government Association (WLGA). The online training and questionnaire tool is intended to be used by many organizations in Wales to identify and commend businesses that are "ASD Aware".

The SERVICE principles have been developed to guide businesses in making no-cost or low-cost changes to their premises and practices. The principles address common challenges that autistic people face when they are out in the community. By applying as many principles as possible, businesses can address the most frequently occurring challenges reported by autistic people. Corrimal, New South Wales, Australia is working towards being the first autism-friendly community in Australia.

=== Recreational facilities ===
==== Inclusive recreation ====
Inclusive recreation, also called adaptive recreation, is when recreational activities are modified to accommodate disabled people.

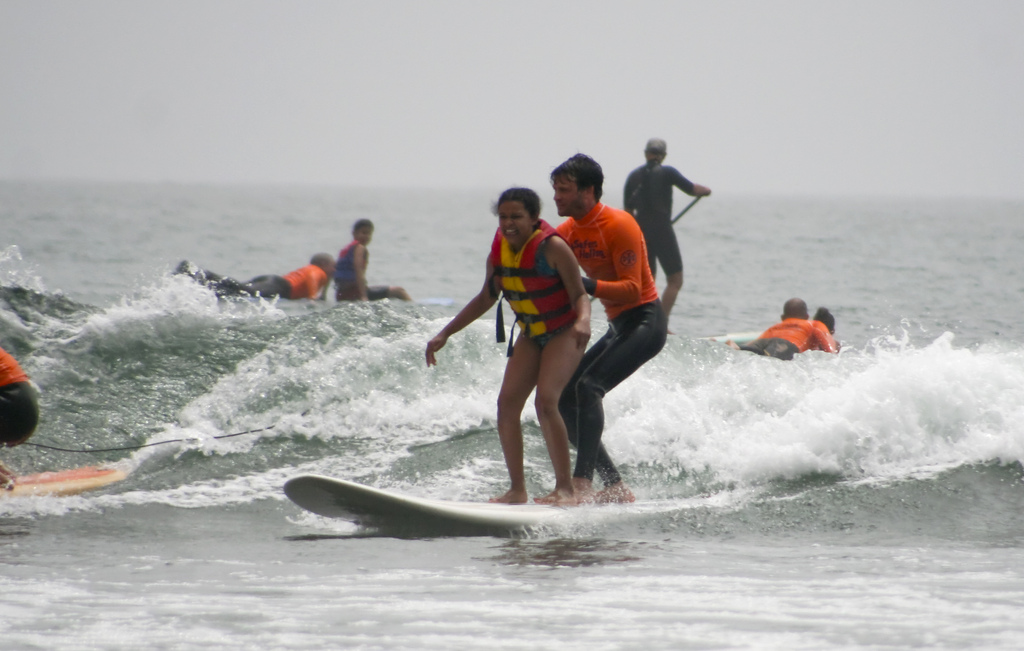
Malibu, California surf adaptive recreation

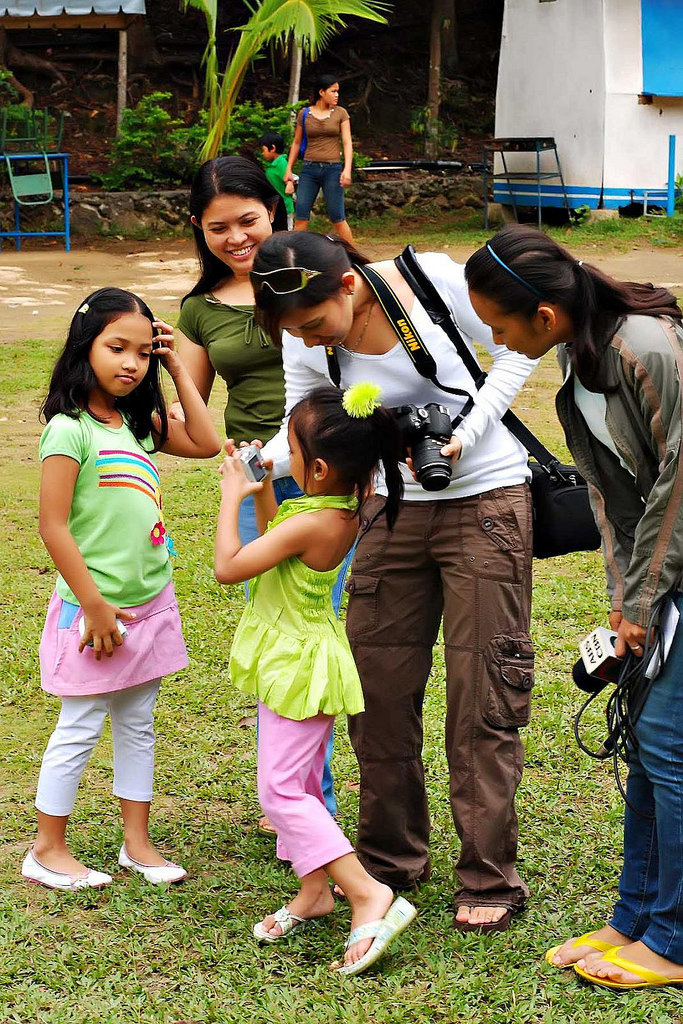
CDP Images Workshop autistic children

== Community involvement ==
Organizations or programs that promote autism-friendly efforts are:

- Autism Awareness Campaign UK
- The Autism Directory in England awards an "Autism Friendly" mark to those companies that undergo The Autism Directory's free autism awareness training. It shows that this particular company has a basic awareness of autism and acts as a good indicator to any potential autistic customers.
- Autism Research Institute (US)
- National Autistic Society (UK)
- Autism Speaks – provides community resources and training materials to support autism-friendly practices in local organizations.
- Hidden Disabilities Sunflower – an international scheme enabling people with invisible disabilities, including autism, to discreetly indicate a need for additional support in public spaces.

== Autism rights movement ==
The rainbow-colored infinity symbol represents the diversity of the autism spectrum as well as the greater neurodiversity movement.

The autism rights movement encourages autistic people to "embrace their neurodiversity" and encourages society to accept autistics as they are. The movement advocates giving children more tools to cope with the non-autistic world instead of trying to change them into neurotypicals, and says society should learn to tolerate harmless behaviours such as tics and stims like hand-flapping or humming. Autism rights activists say that "tics, like repetitive rocking and violent outbursts" can be managed if others make an effort to understand autistic people, while other autistic traits, "like difficulty with eye contact, with grasping humor or with breaking from routines", would not require corrective efforts if others were more tolerant.

=== Autistic pride ===
Autistic pride refers to pride in autism and shifting views of autism from "disease" to "difference". Autistic pride emphasizes the innate potential in all human phenotypic expressions and celebrates the diversity various neurological types express. Autistic pride asserts that autistic people are not sick; rather, they have a unique set of characteristics that provide them many rewards and challenges, not unlike their non-autistic peers.

== See also ==
- Curb cut effect
- Sensory friendly
- Universal design
