= Dimension (disambiguation) =

The dimension of a space or object is informally defined as the minimum number of coordinates needed to specify any point within it.

Dimension or dimensions may also refer to:

== Arts and entertainment ==
=== Film and television ===
- Dimension (film)
- Dimensions (animation), a French animation project focusing on mathematics
- Dimensions (2011 film), a British science fiction film
- Dimensions (2018 film), a Burmese action film
- Dimensions (TV series), an Australian magazine style program later renamed George Negus Tonight
- Dimension Films, a movie company and subsidiary of The Weinstein Company

=== Music ===
- Dimension (musician), the stage name of English record producer Robert Etheridge
- Dimension Records, a record label

=== Albums ===
- Dimensions (Believer album)
- Dimensions, an album by The Box Tops
- Dimensions (Freedom Call album)
- Dimensions (Maynard Ferguson album)
- Dimensions (McCoy Tyner album)
- Dimensions (Octurn album)
- Dimensions (Wolfmother), an EP

=== Songs ===
- "Dimension" (song), the song by Wolfmother
- "Dimension", a song by Joe Morris from Singularity
- "Dimension", a song by TripleS from Assemble24

=== Other uses in arts and entertainment ===
- Dimensions, characters in the video game Rockman & Forte: Challenger from the Future
- Parallel universes in fiction, or parallel dimensions, hypothetical self-contained realities co-existing with one's own
- Lego Dimensions, a Lego-themed toys-to-life video game

== Mathematics ==
- Dimension (graph theory), a property of undirected graphs related to their representations in spaces
- Dimension (vector space), a property of vector spaces
- Bipartite dimension, an intrinsic property of undirected graphs
- Fractal dimension, a property of fractals
- Global dimension, a homological property of mathematical rings
- Krull dimension, an ideal property of mathematical rings
- Order dimension, a property of partially ordered sets
- Dimension of an algebraic variety
- Dimension theory (algebra)
- One of several properties of topological spaces:
  - Complex dimension
  - Hausdorff dimension
  - Inductive dimension
  - Lebesgue covering dimension
  - Packing dimension
  - Isoperimetric dimension

== Science ==
- Measurements of objects can be referred to as dimensions
- Dimensions (astronomy), a way to define the size of irregularly shaped Solar System objects
- Dimension (metadata), in information science
- Dimension (physical quantity), the basic quantities measured (length, time, ...)

== Other uses ==
- Dell Dimension, a desktop computer line
- Dimensions (database), database of research grants
- Dimension (data warehouse), a business database structure
- Dimension (herbicide), a weed control chemical for lawns and gardens
- Plane (esotericism), a state of consciousness said to transcend the physical universe
- Dimensions UK, a learning disabilities charitable society

== See also ==
- Size (disambiguation)
