= Brian Glenney =

American philosopher and graffiti artist

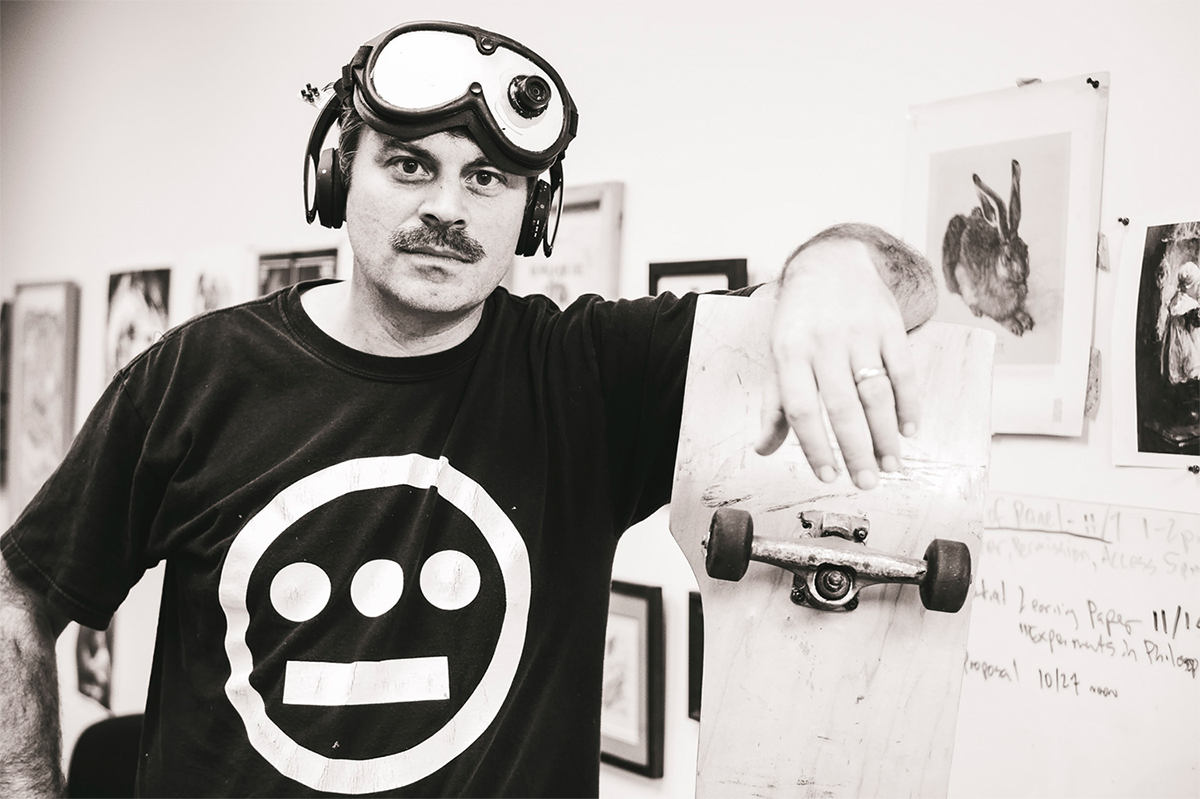
- Born: December 14, 1974 (age 51); Pullman, Washington, United States

Education
- Education: University of Southern California

Philosophical work
- Era: Contemporary philosophy
- Region: Western philosophy
- Main interests: Philosophy of Mind, Molyneux's Problem, Graffiti, Skateboarding
- Notable ideas: Accessible Icon Project

Brian Glenney (born December 14, 1974) is an American Philosopher and Graffiti Artist most known for co-founding a street art project turned movement known as the Accessible Icon Project. The movement re-designed the International Symbol of Access to display an active, engaged image with focus on the person with disability. “It was intended as a kind of radical statement,” says Elizabeth Guffey, author of Designing Disability: Symbols, Space, and Society and professor of art history at SUNY Purchase. “The very oddity of it is people started taking it seriously as a new symbol, and it’s such a weird life that it’s lived, that it’s become a kind of legal symbol.”

The Accessible Icon is in use internationally. It is the default accessibility emoji and its use is a legal requirement in New York and Connecticut. and is used in numerous others, such as on placards in Washington state. However, the icon is also banned federally by the Federal Highway Administration for use on road signs in the United States and the International Organization for Standardization, which established the regular use of the original symbol under ISO 7001, has also rejected the design. The infamy of the Accessible Icon, with its illegal beginnings, and both legalized and banned status, makes it of considerable artistic value, as evidenced by its display and housing in many museum permanent collections, including Museum of Modern Art and Cooper-Hewitt, Smithsonian Design Museum. “We really like the situation we’re in,” Glenney says. “It gives visibility to the context of people with disabilities. It keeps them ‘in the market’ of ideas, so to speak. Our symbol is most successful when it's not fully legal—when there's lots of wrinkles and questions.”

== Education and career ==
After graduating from Shorewood High School, Glenney earned his Bachelor of Arts in philosophy from University of Washington (1999), and his Masters (2000) from University of St. Andrews and Ph.D. (in philosophy; 2007) from the University of Southern California, where his dissertation on Molyneux's Problem was supervised by James Van Cleve and Janet Levin.

Glenney taught for eight years at the religious liberal arts school, Gordon College, but due to his LGBT advocacy was terminated as Associate Professor. He then joined the faculty at Norwich University in 2016.

== Philosophical work ==
Glenney's scholarly writings have been in two main areas—Philosophy of Mind and Urban Arts. Pluralism has been a major theme in both contexts.

=== Philosophy of Mind ===
In Philosophy of Mind, Glenney has specialized in sensory perception, from its ancient history to contemporary empirical considerations. He is co-editor with Jose Filipe Silva of The Senses and the History of Philosophy. Glenney also wrote the entry on Molyneux's Problem for the Routledge Encyclopedia of Philosophy. The over 300 year old problem asks whether a newly sighted person might immediately identify shapes by sight alone that were previously known to touch.

Glenney provides a novel answer: that due to the complexity of visual processing, there are many ways to both see and fail to see shapes, the success of an answer being dependent on context rather than the original intent of the question. Glenney offers, "the first pluralist response: many different answers, both yes and no, are individually sufficient as an answer to the question as a whole" and thus researchers should "take the question to be cluster concept of sub-problems. This response opposes traditional answers that isolate specific perceptual features as uniquely applicable to Molyneux’s question and grant viability to only one reply." This "pluralist" methodology is well received, given that clear and definitive answers in the context of the original question are wanting. "Possibly, as highlighted by Glenney, the most parsimonious way to face the issue raised by Molyneux’s question is to avoid the polarization of the answer into the categories of “yes” and “no”. Indeed, the most promising approaches seem to derive from the combination of diverse techniques, addressing both the behavioural and the neural aspects of this issue."

Glenney has also written several papers on a little known essay on sensory perception "Of the External Senses" by famed economist Adam Smith which provides the first account of perception based on his famous concept of "sympathy." In fact, Glenney goes so far as to argue that Smith's concept of sympathy in his central ethical theory is derived from this little known essay.

=== Urban arts ===
Glenney is also a scholar and practitioner of Skateboarding, holding a unique claim that it does not fit a designated class or kind, being neither a sport, nor lifestyle, nor subversive activity. Glenney's appearances on Thrasher Magazine with the skateboard crew The Worble led to the co-creation of the iconic figure Manramp, a personality known for using plywood to help skateboarders utilize otherwise impossible obstacles in the streets.

=== Other work ===
Glenney is an original member of the notorious graffiti crew: Big Time Mob. He was also a member of Seattle punk bands: Human Struggle and The Guilty, with friends Damien Jurado and David Bazan.

== Books ==
- The Senses and the History of Philosophy (co-edited with Silva) (Routledge, 2019). ISBN 978-1-351-73106-5.
- Molyneux's Question and the History of Philosophy (co-edited with Ferretti) (Routledge, 2020) (Forthcoming)
- Skateboarding and The Senses: Skills, Surfaces, and Spaces (co-authored with Sander Hölsgens) (Routledge, 2024). ISBN 978-1-040-18644-2.

== See also ==
- List of American philosophers
- Philosophy of Mind
- Skateboarding
