= Size (disambiguation) =

Size is the concept of how big or small something is. It may also refer to:

- In statistics (hypothesis testing), the size of the test refers to the rate of false positives, denoted by α
- File size, in computing
- Magnitude (mathematics), magnitude or size of a mathematical object
- Magnitude of brightness or intensity of a star or an earthquake as measured on a logarithmic scale
- In mathematics there are, in addition to the dimensions mentioned above (equal if there is an isometry), various other concepts of size for sets:
  - measure (mathematics), a systematic way to assign to each suitable subset a number
  - cardinality (equal if there is a bijection), of a set is a measure of the "number of elements of the set"
  - for well-ordered sets: ordinal number (equal if there is an order-isomorphism)
- Resizing (fiction), a theme in fiction, in particular in fairy tales, fantasy, and science fiction
- Sizing, or size, a filler or glaze
- Size (surname)
- Clothing size, the label sizes used for garments sold off-the-shelf
- Size (band), a Mexican punk rock band
