= Help Mark =

Japanese accessibility symbol

The Help Mark consists of a white heart under a white cross on a red rectangle.

The Help Mark (Japanese: ヘルプマーク, Hepburn: Herupumāku) is a Japanese accessibility symbol for use by those with invisible disabilities. It was designed by the Tokyo Metropolitan Government and first distributed in 2012. By 2021, all Japanese prefectures had introduced the symbol.

Document explaining the Help Mark

The Help Mark is a symbol used by those in Japan who need special consideration or assistance due to invisible disabilities, such as prostheses, mental disabilities, hearing or vision impairment, or chronic illnesses. It consists of a red rectangle with a white cross above a white heart; the red and the cross represents those in need of assistance, while the heart represents those willing to assist. Tags bearing the Help Mark, themselves called marks, can be carried or worn somewhere on one's person.

Others are encouraged to offer their seats on trains or buses to those with a mark and assist in evacuation in the case of an emergency. They are available free of charge from government offices in Japan. They do not require disability certification or paperwork to be acquired and used.

== History ==
The Help Mark was designed by the Tokyo Metropolitan Government in 2012 after a Tokyo Metropolitan Assembly member with an artificial joint called for the creation of a mark to represent people with invisible disabilities. The Tokyo government began distributing Help Mark tags on the Toei Ōedo Line in October 2012. In July 2013, the program expanded to include the other Toei Subway lines, the Nippori-Toneri Liner, the Toden Arakawa Line, and Toei Bus, while in December 2016 they began to be distributed at the Tokyo metropolitan hospitals.

Kyoto Prefecture adopted the Help Mark and began distributing various devices bearing the mark in 2016. In 2017, in preparation for the 2020 Summer Olympics and Paralympics in Tokyo, the Help Mark was incorporated into the Japanese Industrial Standards, granting it national recognized status and leading to increased use by prefectural governments outside of Tokyo. By October 2021, the Help Mark had been introduced in all Japanese prefectures. A survey of residents in the Hokuriku region (along the northwestern coast of Honshu) found that approximately 80% of respondents were able to identify the mark, and that 46% had seen someone carrying it.

== See also ==
- Disability in Japan
- Hidden Disabilities Sunflower – British scheme and company
- International Symbol of Access – Symbol denoting improved access in areas
