= The Autism Directory =

British charitable organisation

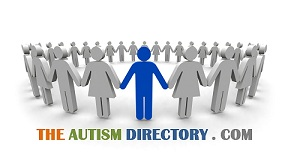
- Founded: November 2010
- Founder: Nadine Honeybone
- Type: Charitable organisation
- Registration no.: 1143855
- Location: South Wales
- Region served: United Kingdom
- Website: www.theautismdirectory.com

The Autism Directory is a charitable organisation based in the United Kingdom. It aims to pull together useful resources and information concerning autism in the UK, and signpost it from the directory in order to help those living with autism get the help they need.

== History ==
The Autism Directory was launched in November 2010 at Ashgrove, a specialist school for autism in Penarth South Wales by Assembly Member Janet Ryder. In September 2011 The Autism Directory achieved its Charity Status and is registered with the Charities Commission.

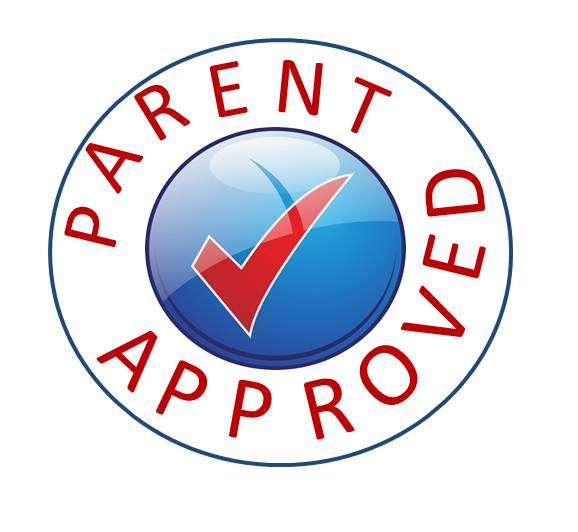
Parent Approved Mark

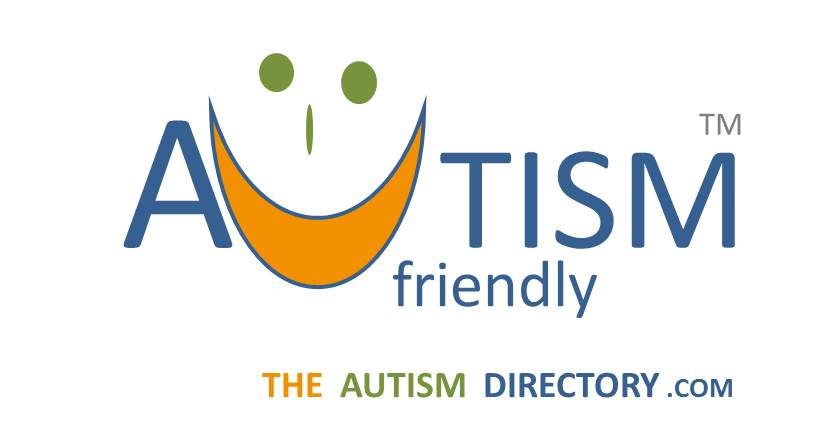
Autism Friendly Mark

== The Directory ==
The main activity is the directory which categorises the resources and information about autism into a number of categories (examples below). The directory is UK wide and is user generated so it relies on the community and businesses in local areas to help build the directory.

- Health
- Treatments & Therapies
- Education
- Personal Support
- Living Support
- Money Matters
- Recreation & Leisure
- Autism Friendly places to go
- Other Resources e.g. Events, Conferences, Training, Books Magazines etc.

== Autism Friendly Mark ==
The "Autism-friendly" mark is awarded to those companies that have received Autism Awareness training from various approved organisations including The Autism Directory itself. It shows that this particular company has a basic awareness of autism and acts as a good indicator to any potential customers.

== Trustees and Management ==
- Steve White - Chairman
- Rob Warlow - Treasurer
- Carmen Gray - Secretary
- Russell Davies - Trustee
- Paul Guns - Trustee
- Chris Barber - Trustee
- Wayne Lewis - Trustee
- Chris Price - Trustee
- Nadine Honeybone - Founder & CEO
- Gareth Tarrant - Charity Operations Officer
- Suzanne McCabe - Head of Support
- Joanne Howe - Head of Services
- Steven Crichton - Directory Manager
