= Invisible disability =

Disability that is not immediately noticeable to others

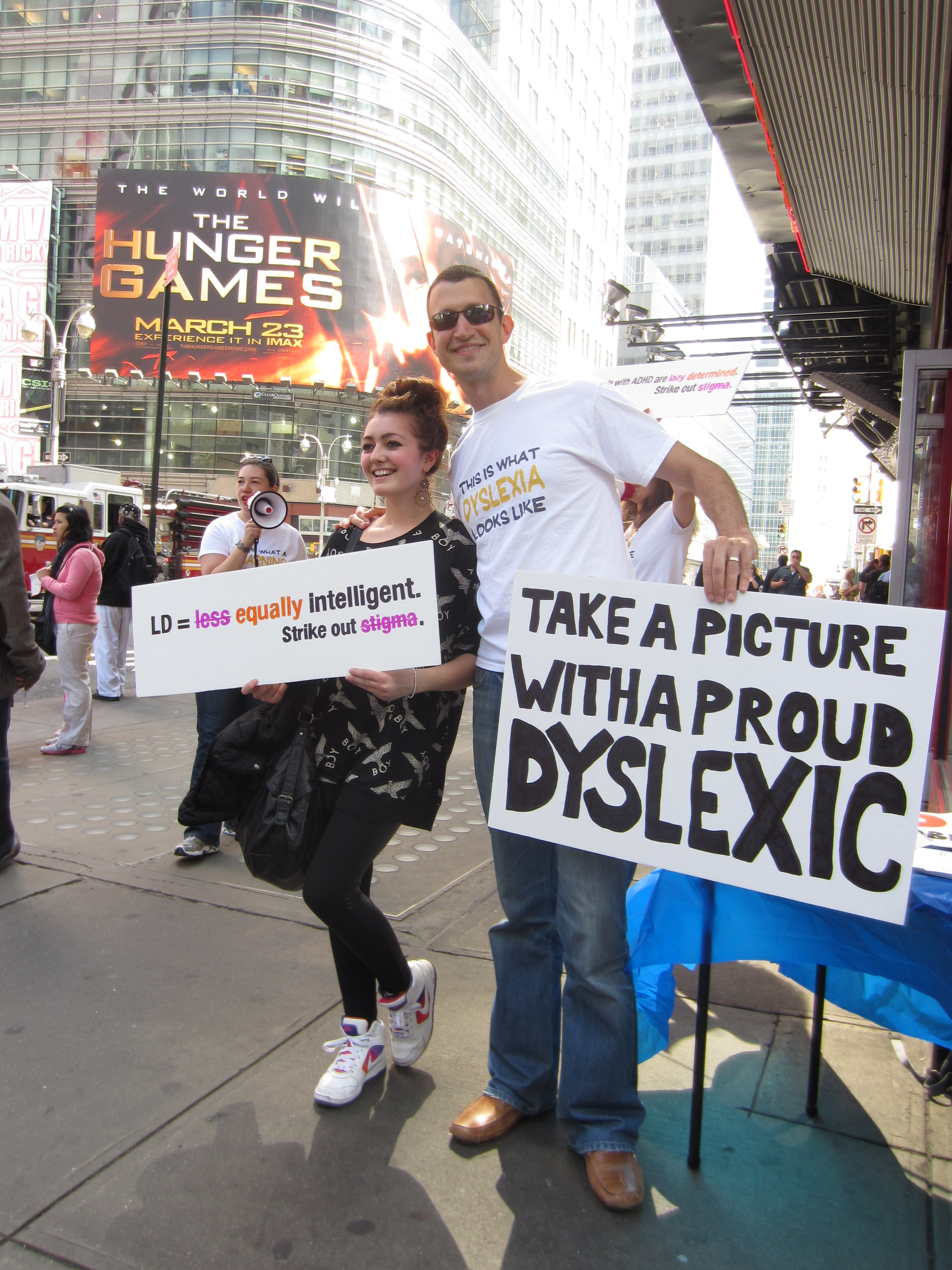
A woman holding a sign that says "LD = ~~Less~~ equally intelligent / Strike out ~~stigma~~" poses for a photo in Times Square with a man holding a sign that says "Take a picture with a proud dyslexic". The event was held by Project Eye-To-Eye to raise awareness of Learning Disabilities Month in 2012.

Invisible disabilities, also known as hidden disabilities or non-visible disabilities (NVDs), are disabilities that are not immediately apparent. Invisible disabilities range from chronic illnesses, fatigue, autism, ADHD, mental health disorders, and hearing/vision loss. Invisible disabilities can also include issues with mobility, such as a sitting disability like chronic back pain, joint problems, or chronic pain. In order to lessen the onset of these symptoms, a person can use different instruments. These types of disabilities can have an impact in higher education and workforce settings, as well as going about daily life. The population who identifies as having invisible disabilities is vast and covers different countries. Campaigns were created in past years, which have brought awareness to invisible disabilities and disabilities, more broadly. Along with campaigns, legislations have helped shed light on how to best help those with disabilities.

== Assistive devices ==
Various types of tools and accommodations are available for people with disabilities, which may keep their disability hidden, or make it apparent. For example, some people with visual or auditory disabilities who do not wear glasses or hearing aids, or who use contacts or discreet hearing aids, may not be obviously disabled. People affected may not use mobility aids on some days, or at all, because severity of pain or level of mobility may change from day to day. This may increase stigma, as society may question if they need mobility aids if they are only using them part of the time. It is known as the suspicion of faking.

== Statistics ==
Of people with chronic illnesses, 96% have an invisible disability. It is estimated that 1 in 10 Americans live with an invisible disability. This number is likely higher worldwide, as 80% of all people with disabilities live in developing countries.

Mental disorders or developmental disabilities, such as ADHD, depression, anxiety, addiction, dyslexia, autism, or schizophrenia, are also classified as invisible disabilities because they are usually not detected immediately by looking at or talking to a person.

While mental disorders are not the only form of invisible disabilities, they are not to be missed. The National Institution of Mental Health says 1 in 5 US citizens are currently diagnosed. The key term "diagnosed" implies that there are millions more citizens who do not seek help. In other words, roughly 57 million American adults are diagnosed with mental disorders. On top of this, about 1 in 25 Americans have some form of serious mental conditions, which separate them from their lives in aspects of work and relations.

== The role of the environment ==
Most people with repetitive strain injury move in typical and inconspicuous ways, and are even encouraged by the medical community to be as active as possible, including playing sports. Yet, those people can have dramatic limitations in how much they can type or write, or how long they can hold a phone or other objects in their hands.

People with disabilities may experience solely visible or invisible ailments, while others may experience both. This includes impairments that may only be visible due to specific circumstances. The struggles people experience regarding their invisible disabilities may stem from medical issues and are heavily shaped by societal attitudes, stigma, and misunderstanding. Society has defined a certain view of being sick. Therefore, when society claims that someone doesn't look sick because their disability is invisible, it is dismissive, doubtful, and minimizing. This creates a need for people to justify or prove their illness which adds emotional stress and is disliked by disability studies scholars.

== The impact of invisible disabilities ==
Invisible disabilities can hinder a person's efforts to go to school, work, socialize, and more. Although the disability creates a challenge for the person who has it, the reality of the disability can be difficult for others to recognize or acknowledge. Others may not understand the cause of apparent problems if they cannot see evidence of a disability. Due to a lack of awareness and difficulty accessing support in certain environments, individuals with invisible disabilities may face challenges throughout daily life. Some people may go through a majority of their life until being properly diagnosed as providers can be unfamiliar with certain conditions or due to socioeconomic status. Students with cognitive impairments find it difficult to organize and complete school work, but teachers who are unaware of the reason for a student's difficulties can become impatient. A columnist for Psychology Today wrote:

I recently met Grace, a woman who had a traumatic brain injury when she was sixteen years old. She was in a car accident, an all too common occurrence. An accident occurs, the head hits a part of the car and internal damage to the brain results, ranging from mild to severe. Grace shows no outside cues of brain damage. There are no visible cues of her head injury. Grace's walking, vision and physical reflexes look "normal." [...] People look at Grace and assume she is fine and then react to her difficulty as if she is being lazy or choosing to be obstinate. Teachers' judgments of Grace have been based on assumptions made from Grace's physical appearance.

This lack of understanding can be detrimental to a person's social capital. People may see someone with an invisible disability as lazy, weak, or antisocial. A disability may cause someone to lose connections with friends or family due to this lack of understanding, potentially leading to lower self-esteem. Individuals with invisible disabilities may experience guilt or misunderstandings when asking for support, which can result in negative self-perception. Receiving accommodations can be a complex process of acquiring and submitting documentation of a disability, which employers and educational institutions can deny or deem as outdated. Specialists and resources may be scarce, far and few between, with long waiting periods of months or years. Someone who has a condition that is not immediately visible, such as chronic migraines, may struggle with the fear of being accused of faking or lying when it comes to asking for accommodations.

A disability that may be visible in some situations may not be obvious in others, which can result in a serious problem. For example, a plane passenger who is deaf may be unable to hear verbal instructions given by a flight attendant. It is for this reason that travelers with a hidden disability are advised to inform the airline of their need for accommodations before their flight. One such passenger wrote in The Globe and Mail that:

Once, flying to Washington shortly after 9/11, I didn't hear the announcement that absolutely no one was to get out of their seat for the last 30 minutes of the flight. Normally, I get up to use the washroom 20 minutes before landing. If the nice stewardess had not remembered me and come over to my seat, crouched down to my eye level, and told me that if I had to use the washroom, I had better use it right now, who knows what might have happened. I later learned the air marshals on board would have thrown a blanket on me and wrestled me to the floor.

== Disability in the workplace ==
Some employees with an invisible disability choose not to disclose their diagnosis with their employer, due to social stigma directed at people with disabilities, either in the workplace or in society in general. This may occur when a psychiatric disability is involved, or a number of other medical conditions that are invisible. Researchers in the human resources field may need to take this non-disclosure into account when carrying out studies. Many people who think of those with a disability generally consider them lower to middle class due to their medical costs, and also because many people with disabilities often lack reliable, full-time employment. According to one US survey, 74% of individuals with a disability do not use a wheelchair or other aids that may visually portray their disability. A 2011 survey found that 88% of people with an invisible disability had negative views of disclosing their disability to employers. A 2022 study on disabled students found that those with invisible disabilities felt less supported by their educational institution than their visible counterparts. Students with visible disabilities are more likely to identify as disabled and disclose their identity compared to students with invisible disabilities.

Data from the Bureau of Labor Statistics in 2017 states that the unemployment rate for individuals with an invisible disability is higher than those without one. The unemployment rate for people with a disability was 9.2%, while the rate of those without was less than half of this at only 4.2%. BBC states that people with HIV specifically have an unemployment rate three times higher than those without HIV. Lower call-back rates have been observed in job applicants who choose to disclose their disability to possible employers. An article by Michael Prince and others explains that it is up to the individual if they want to tell their employer about their circumstances, while taking into account the climate that has currently existed surrounding people who learn and interpret the world differently.

Beyond the work force, Bureau of Labor Statistics data also showed that individuals with an invisible disability are also less likely to receive a Bachelor's degree or attend higher education. Many of the challenges students with invisible disabilities face come from the structure of academia, rather than the disability itself. Things like rigid schedules, heavy workloads, and inflexible expectations make attaining a degree especially difficult. Accommodations are available, however, students must disclose their disability, which can create stigma, social barriers, or different treatment from peers. Therefore, under the social model of disability, the structures need to change by allowing students to choose their accommodations and allowing flexibility. Students with invisible disabilities may face additional challenges, as their disabilities may be doubted, and they could be accused of cheating or trying to get an unfair advantage.

People with disabilities are more likely to face difficulty accessing financial support; a UK study reports that disabled people pay approximately £583 average per month out of pocket on additional costs regarding their disability. A news feature in the journal Nature interviewed a US individual with chronic fatigue syndrome who reported attending 117 doctor appointments and paying US$18 000 in out-of-pocket expenses in 2017 alone. Health insurance may not cover treatment, especially if it is experimental.

== Prevalence ==
=== Worldwide ===
Based on findings by the World Health Organization, there are approximately 1.3 billion people who experience significant disability worldwide, representing at least 16% of the global population.

People with invisible disabilities come in contact with law enforcement almost every day, all over the world. Signs of an invisible disability, according to the National Disabilities Association, include that sensory disorders are subject to promote a "fight or flight" response, a person with diabetes is subject to failing a sobriety test, any medication mistaken for paraphernalia, and non-compliant people may be non-verbal.

=== United States ===
In the United States, 96% of people with chronic medical conditions show no outward signs of their illness, and 10% experience symptoms that are considered disabling.

Nearly one in two Americans (165 million) has a chronic medical condition of one kind or another. However, most of these people are not actually disabled, as their medical conditions do not impair normal activities.

Ninety-six percent of people with chronic medical conditions live with a condition that is invisible. These people do not use a cane or any assistive device and act as if they did not have a medical condition. About a quarter of them have some type of activity limitation, ranging from mild to severe; the remaining 75% are not disabled by their chronic conditions.

=== United Kingdom ===
In the United Kingdom, a survey conducted from 2020 to 2021 found that over 1 in 5, 28%, of individuals are disabled, an estimated 70 to 80% of these disabilities being invisible.

=== Australia ===
In Australia, an article published in November 2022 stated that of the approximately 4.4 million disabled Australians, an estimated 3.5 million or 80% of them have an invisible disability.

In 2018 there were 205,200 autistic Australians or 4.66% of the disabled population. Of these, 40.8% reported an unmet need for assistance with cognitive or emotional tasks.

== Legal protection ==
On 13 December 2006, the United Nations Convention on the Rights of Persons with Disabilities was formed, which in turn provides worldwide legal protection for persons with disabilities. With 82 signatories on the initial day, the CRPD became the first comprehensive human rights treaty of the 21st century, coming into effect on 3 May 2008, while emphasizing a shift of viewing persons of disabilities as "objects" of charity to recognizing them as individuals with rights. The Convention addresses various facets of the lives of persons with disabilities, ensuring their rights in areas such as education, employment, healthcare, accessibility, privacy, and cultural and sporting activities.

Americans with invisible disabilities are protected by national and local disability laws, such as the Americans with Disabilities Act which outlaws the discrimination of people living with disabilities.

The Individuals with Disabilities Education Act, originally the Education for All Handicapped Children Act in 1975, requires special education programs and disability services for eligible students with disabilities, as defined by each state. Subchapter 3, Infants and Toddlers with Disabilities, outlines the necessity of early intervention to mitigate developmental delay and the steps necessary to develop intervention.

In the United Kingdom, the Equality Act 2010 (and the Disability Discrimination Act 1995 before it) requires employers to make reasonable adjustments for employees with disabilities, both visible and invisible. The nation has a number of other policies and acts relevant to invisible disability such as the Mental Capacity Act 2005, Care Act 2014, and Autism Act 2009. Access to Work (ATW) and the Disabled Students Allowance (DSA) are examples of government programs that provide support for disabled people in the workforce and educational institutions.

== Responses ==
A growing number of organizations, governments, and institutions are implementing policies and regulations to accommodate persons with invisible disabilities. Governments and school boards have implemented screening tests to identify students with learning disabilities, as well as other invisible disabilities, such as vision or hearing difficulties, problems in cognitive ability, motor skills, or social and emotional development. If a hidden disability is identified, resources can be used to place a child in a special education program that will help them progress in school. Hidden disabilities are hard to spot, and as a result, people will have a hard time pointing it out. A number of universities worldwide have formulated policies to implement and enhance support services.

=== Hidden Disabilities Sunflower ===
One mitigation is to provide an easy way for people to self-designate as having an invisible disability, and for organizations to have processes in place to assist those so self-designating. An example of this is the Hidden Disabilities Sunflower, initially launched in the UK in 2016 but now gaining some international recognition as well. The Hidden Disabilities Sunflower Lanyard program is integrated into 340 airports in 70 countries, and 31 airlines worldwide.

Another similar example is the Help Mark, created by a Tokyo Metropolitan Assembly member who had an artificial joint in her right leg. The badge design was done by Tokyo Metropolitan Government in 2012 and was used to spread awareness of hidden disabilities in preparation for the 2020 Tokyo Olympic and Paralympic Games.

Some scholars argue that these opt-in programs can be extremely beneficial for people to gain access to accessible places, like restrooms or sensory rooms. These programs can also potentially reduce the stigma of asking for help and can create a more inclusive, polite, and understanding environment. Some side against this, arguing that the self-labeling system marking individuals as disabled can cause others to view them with negative connotation, potentially creating even greater difficulties.

Some studies suggest that such programs like these place the responsibility of creating an accessible environment onto the person with a disability rather than the environment. The medical model of disability follows this concept as it suggests that disabled people need to be fixed and should be identified as having a disability. Under the social model of disability, the suggestion is leveled at the failure of the non-disabled in society to adapt and consider the needs of disabled people, pairing with the broader neurodiversity and disability rights movements.

=== University accommodation ===
In the United States, the Americans with Disabilities Act of 1990 orders reasonable accommodation at schools and federally funded institutions. For a college or university, what constitutes reasonable accommodation is largely left up to the institution to determine. Because the definition is determined by what the university considers necessary, students with invisible disabilities are often not supported through accommodating measures, as their disabilities are not apparent to the deciding board. Students with disabilities are much less likely to graduate on time than their non-disabled peers.

== Campaigns ==
In the United Kingdom, activist Athaly Altay began the End Fake Claiming Campaign in 2021, to raise awareness of the widespread harassment faced by people with invisible disabilities. The campaign calls on the UK government to update hate crime laws to make fake claiming a specific hate crime.

Signs displaying the message "Not Every Disability is Visible" were campaigned by Crohn's & Colitis UK to be installed in organizations and businesses.

Another campaign titled "Nothing About Us Without Us," was and still is the hallmark of the disability advocacy protests time period. The purpose of this campaign over the years has been monumental. "Nothing About Us Without Us" has given people with disabilities the attitude to fight in order to be heard. The origins of this campaign first came about in the late 90s between two groups that were located outside of the U.S.

== See also ==
- Equal Employment Opportunity Commission – US agency fighting workplace discrimination
- Social model of disability – Societal failure to adapt to disabilities
