= Rehabilitation International =

International disability rights organization

Logo of Rehabilitation International

Rehabilitation International (RI Global) is an international disability rights organization with member organizations in every region of the world. The RI secretariat is located in New York City.

Founded in 1922, RI is a network of people with disabilities, service providers, government agencies, academics, researchers and advocates working to improve the quality of life of people with disabilities. A major focus of its activity since 1999 has been establishing the Convention on the Rights of Persons with Disabilities.

In the late 1960s, RI created the ubiquitous International Symbol of Access, featuring a stylized person in a wheelchair on a blue background.

== Commissions ==
RI maintains commissions of specialists and experts on various issues in disability. Represented by the RI Chairs and Vice Chairs, the commissions are thematic work groups which assist in developing and expanding program activities in accordance with RI's strategic goals.

RI commissions include:

- Education Commission
- Health and Function Commission
- International Commission on Technology and Accessibility (ICTA)
- Leisure, Recreation and Physical Activities Commission
- Policy and Service Commission
- Social Commission
- Work and Employment Commission

== Projects ==
RI works with its members, partners, experts and regional leaders to create and carry out projects with the following objectives across the globe:

- Accessibility
- Disaster Management
- Empowerment
- Rehabilitation & Habilitation
- Poverty Reduction
- Implementation of the UN CRPD
