= International Symbol of Access =

Symbol denoting improved access in areas

International Symbol of Access

ISO 7001 PI AC 001, Full accessibility or toilets – accessible

The International Symbol of Access (ISA), also known as the International Wheelchair Symbol, denotes areas where access has been improved, mostly for those with disabilities. It consists of a usually blue square overlaid in white (or in contrasting colours) with a stylized image of a person in a wheelchair. It is maintained as the international standard ISO 7001, image of the International Commission on Technology and Accessibility (ICTA), a committee of Rehabilitation International (RI).

== History ==
In the late 1960s, with the rise of universal design, there grew a need for a symbol to identify accessible facilities. In 1968, Norman Acton, President of Rehabilitation International (RI), tasked Karl Montan, chairman of the International Commission of Technology and Accessibility (ICTA), to develop a symbol as a technical aid and present in the group's 1969 World Congress convention in Dublin.

The project was arranged with the Scandinavian Students Organization (SDO) in Konstfack's College of Arts. The symbol which would become the ISA was designed by Danish design student Susanne Koefoed. She presented an early version of the symbol at the July 1968 exhibition held during the end of the SDO seminar. Koefoed's symbol depicts a stickfigure on a wheelchair. It is influenced by the contemporary design movement of Scandinavia in the 20th century, especially that of Austrian-American designer and lecturer Victor Papanek.

The committee founded by Montan selected Koefoed's sketch alongside five other symbols. The revised design was modified with the addition of a circle for a head to give the impression of a seated figure, as Montan noted: "a slight inconvenience with the symbol is the equally thick lines, which may give an impression of a monogram of letters. With a 'head' on the symbol this inconvenience would disappear". This was done without Koefoed's knowledge according to her own recounting.

The design was made public in 1969 and was widely promoted around Sweden. It was approved in the conference, gained prominence and usage through convenient signage created by 3M Corporation, and was later incorporated into the ISO 7001 standard published by the International Organization for Standardization. In 1974, it was formally accepted by the United Nations in an experts' meeting on disability.

== Functions ==
Proposed variant from Rehabilitation International made in 1969.

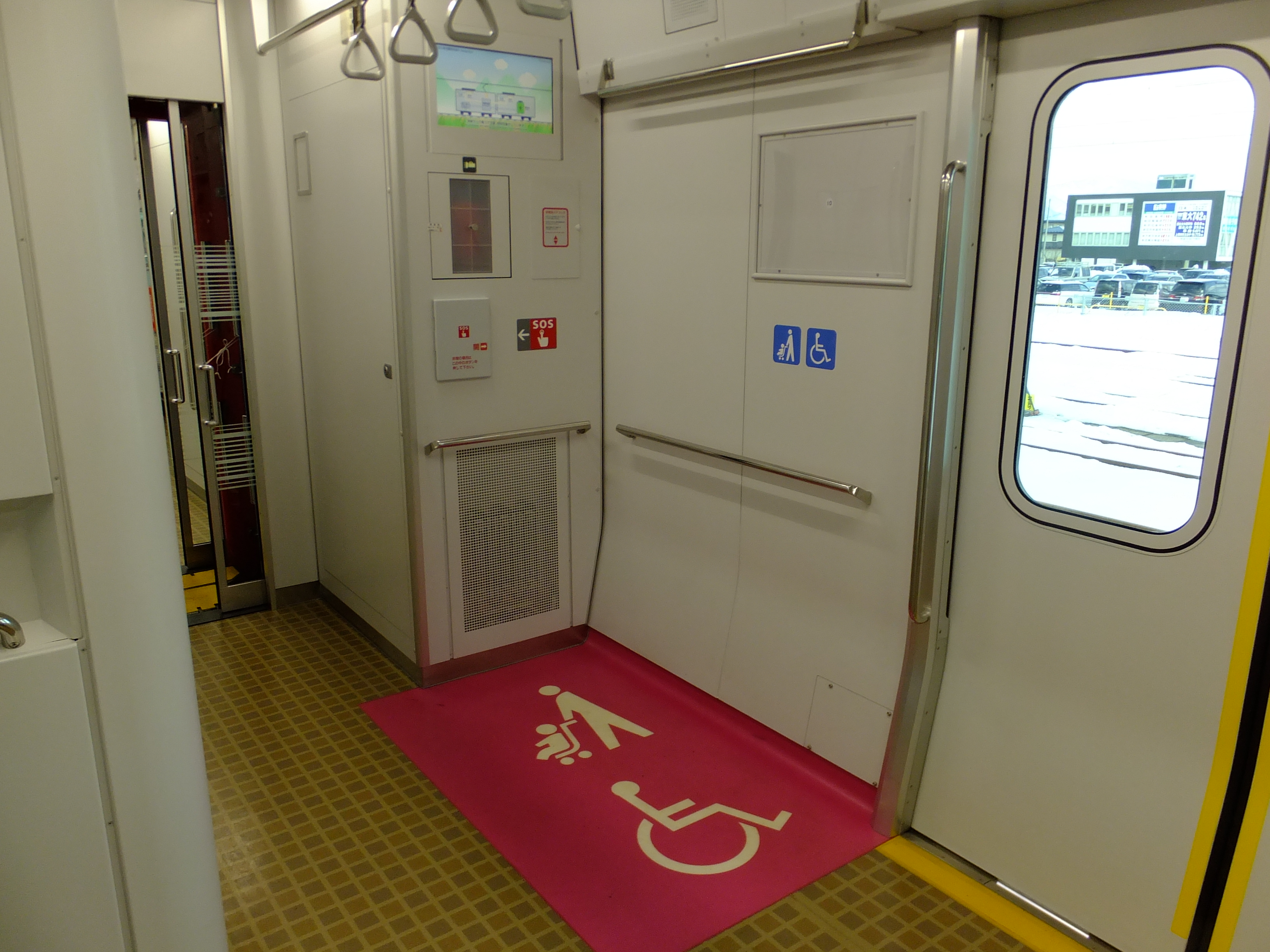
Space for wheelchair users and people carrying strollers in a train

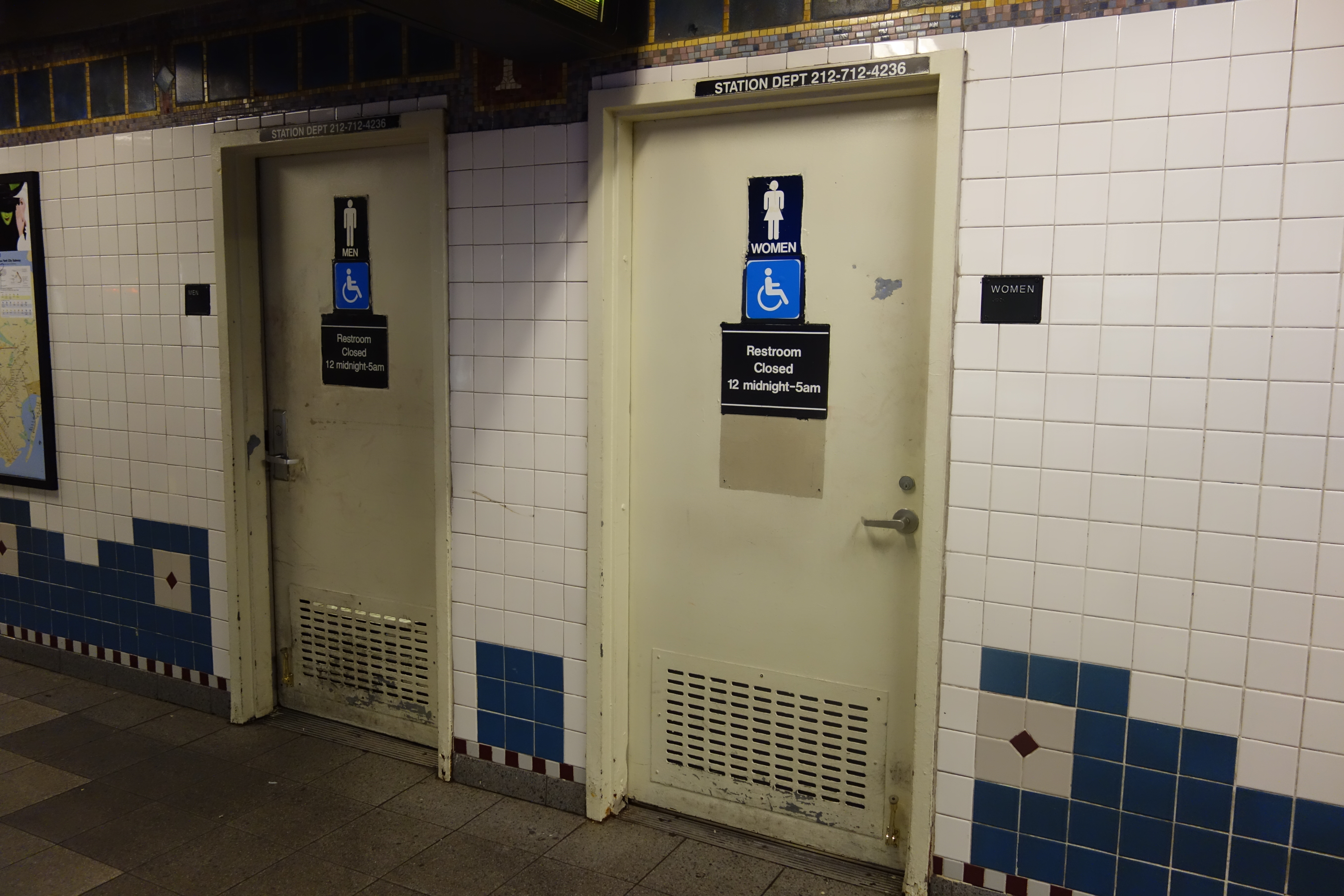
Wheelchair accessible public bathrooms in Brooklyn, New York

The symbol is often seen where access has been improved, particularly for wheelchair users, but also for other disability issues. Frequently, the symbol denotes the removal of environmental barriers, such as steps, which also helps older people, parents with baby carriages, and travellers. Universal design aims to obviate such symbols by creating products and facilities that are accessible to nearly all users from the start. The wheelchair symbol is "international" and therefore not accompanied by Braille in any particular language.

Specific uses of the ISA include:

- Marking a parking space reserved for vehicles used by people with disabilities/blue badge holders
- Marking a vehicle used by a person with a disability, often for permission to use a space
- Marking a public lavatory with facilities designed for wheelchair users
- Indicating a button to activate an automatic door
- Indicating an accessible transit station or vehicle
- Indicating a transit route that uses accessible vehicles

Building codes such as the California Building Code, require "a white figure on a blue background. The blue shall be equal to Color No. 15090 in Federal Standard 595B."

== Accessible Icon ==
Accessible Icon

In 2010, artists Sara Hendren, Brian Glenney, and Tim Ferguson Sauder co-founded the Accessible Icon project, an art project in order to design a new icon with focus on the person with disability, as they felt that the old icon felt "robotic" and "stiff". It underwent many versions until arriving at the current, dynamic design depicting a person leaning forward, with arms raised, to indicate movement.

Some disability organizations such as Enabling Unit in India have promoted the icon. This version of the symbol is officially used in the U.S. states of New York and Connecticut. The Modified ISA is in the permanent collection of Museum of Modern Art in New York. In Canada, it is permitted as an alternative option in the British Columbia Building Codes 2024 edition, but not yet permitted in the national parent code or Alberta edition.

The Accessible Icon has also had detractors within the disabled community. According to Emma Teitel of the Toronto Star, critics say that the modified image does not universally represent all disabled people, since it socially stigmatizes those who have a disability but do not use a wheelchair. Critics have defended the old International Symbol of Access for its more abstract design, which leaves more to the imagination and can represent any disability.

In May 2015, the Federal Highway Administration rejected the new design for use on road signs in the United States, citing the fact that it has not been adopted or endorsed by the U.S. Access Board, the agency responsible for developing the federal criteria for accessible design. The International Organization for Standardization, which established the regular use of the original symbol under ISO 7001, has also rejected the design.

In 2024, the new design has been integrated in the improved European Parking card for persons with disabilities.

== Unicode ==
Wheelchair emoji in Noto

Android Oreo (8.x)

Android 10

The Unicode character encoding standard contains a wheelchair symbol at code point U+267F ♿ WHEELCHAIR SYMBOL, which was added to Unicode 4.1 in 2005 as part of Emoji 1.0. In 2016 with the release of iOS 10.0, Apple updated the emoji to use the Accessible Icon. However, this symbol is not the official, International Symbol of Access, but is instead an alternate version that is intended to depict an individual exercising control over their life, rather than the more passive connotation of the standardized symbol.

== See also ==
- Help Mark
