= Social Stories =

Method of teaching social skills

Social Stories were devised as a tool to help autistic individuals better understand the nuances of interpersonal communication so that they could "interact in an effective and appropriate manner". Although the prescribed format was meant for high functioning people with basic communication skills, the format was adapted substantially to suit individuals with poor communication skills and low level functioning, for example children who are struggling with understanding social situations or when coping with change. The evidence shows that there has been minimal improvement in social interaction skills. However, it is difficult to assess whether the concept would have been successful if it had been carried out as designed.

Social stories are being used, though, in targeted ways to prepare individuals for social interaction and to prepare individuals with autism for public events.

== Overview ==
Social Stories are a concept devised by Carol Gray in 1991 to improve the social skills of people with autism spectrum disorders (ASD). The objective is to share information, which is often through a description of the events occurring around the subject, and also why. Social stories are used to educate and as praise. They can be told by an educator, a parent, a social worker or a school psychologist. Social stories model appropriate social interaction by describing a situation with relevant social cues, others' perspectives, and a suggested appropriate response. About one half of the time, the stories are used to acknowledge and praise successful completion of an accomplishment.

Social stories are considered a type of social narrative.

== Detail ==
Individuals with an ASD have significant impairments in the social domain as defined by the nature of the diagnosis cited in the DSM-IV. The social impairment may include, but is not limited to, the use of body language, play skills, understanding emotions, and social communication ability. There is a great emphasis placed on the importance of teaching social skills to individuals with ASD. It has been identified as one of the best indicators of positive long-term outcomes.

According to Attwood, "A social story is written with the intention of providing information and tuition on what people in a given situation are doing, thinking or feeling, the sequence of events, the identification of significant social cues and their meaning, and the script of what to do or say; in other words, the what, when, who and why aspects of social situations". It breaks down a challenging social situation into understandable steps by omitting irrelevant information and by being highly descriptive to help an individual with an ASD understand the entirety of a situation. It includes answers to questions such as who, what, when, where, and why in social situations through the use of visuals and written text. Social Stories are used to teach particular social skills, such as identifying important cues in a given situation; taking another's point of view; understanding rules, routines, situations, upcoming events, or abstract concepts; and understanding expectations.

The goal of a Social Story is to reveal accurate social information in a clear and reassuring manner that is easily understood by the individual with an ASD. The improved understanding of the events and expectations may lead to a change in behavior, although it is suggested that the goal of a Social Story should not be to change individual behavior.

Social Stories use a specifically defined style and format. In the initial version, four types of sentences were used (descriptive, perspective, directive, affirmative), along with a basic sentence type ratio. Control, co-operative, and partial sentence types have been added to the model.

While the primary mode of presentation of Social Stories remains written text, other formats have been trialled with younger children and people with intellectual disabilities. Such formats have included singing, apron story-telling, and computer-based presentations.

== Types of sentences ==
There are seven sentence types that may be used in a Social Story.

- Descriptive sentences: are truthful and observable sentences (opinion- and assumption-free) that identify the most relevant factors in a social situation. They often answer "why" questions.
- Perspective sentences: refer to or describe the internal state of other people (their knowledge/thoughts, feelings, beliefs, opinions, motivation, or physical condition) so that the individual can learn how others perceive various events.
- Directive sentences: present or suggest, in positive terms, a response or choice of responses to a situation or concept.
- Affirmative sentences: enhance the meaning of statements and may express a commonly shared value or opinion. They can also stress the important points, refer to a law or rule to reassure the learner.
- Control sentences: identify personal strategies the individual will use to recall and apply information. They are written by the individual after reviewing the Social Story.
- Cooperative sentences: describe what others will do to assist the individual. This helps to ensure consistent responses by a variety of people.
- Partial sentences: encourage the individual to make guesses regarding the next step in a situation, the response of another individual, or his/her own response. Any of the above sentences can be written as a partial sentence with a portion of the sentence being a blank space to complete.

Social Story ratio: Two to five cooperative, descriptive, perspective, and/or affirmative sentences for every directive or control sentence.

== Research ==
=== Population ===
It was suggested originally that this method should be used with only higher functioning individuals who possess basic language ability; however, these guidelines were expanded to include children with more severe learning disabilities. To accommodate differences in ability, one sentence per page paired with pictures could help individuals concentrate on one concept at a time, while the pictures enhance the meaning of the text. The addition of pictorial representation or visual is supported by claims that many individuals with an ASD learn visually. The efficacy of using Social Stories with other populations of individuals, other than those with an ASD, has not yet been sufficiently studied.

=== Evaluating research ===
Although Social Stories have been recommended as an effective intervention for children with ASD since the early 1990s, the research on their effectiveness is still limited.

The American Psychological Association has identified two levels of criteria which are used to consider an intervention "empirically supported". An intervention is considered well established if it meets the following criteria:

- greater than nine well-controlled single-case design studies comparing the intervention to another treatment
- the studies have treatment manuals
- the studies clearly describe characteristics of the client samples

An intervention is considered probably efficacious if it meets the above criteria for greater than three single-case studies.

Social Stories are neither considered well-established, nor considered probably efficacious, due to the limitations of the current body of research.

=== Effectiveness ===
Reviews of the use of Social Stories have found that the reported effects were highly inconsistent, that they allow for stimulus control to be transferred from teachers and peers directly to the student with an ASD, and that there was substantial variation in the delivery of the intervention. Changes in target behavior were generally modest. A 2006 review found Social Stories to be in the non-effective range in interventions or at very best, in the low end of the mildly effective range. It was often hard to attribute success to the Social Story technique since there were multiple interventions used simultaneously. Specifically, many of the studies used prompting methods such as verbal, visual, or physical prompts and/or positive reinforcement. Two reviews suggested that continual implementation may be required; children should reread their Social Stories with some frequency to continue to benefit from their desired effects.

== Targeted use ==
=== Preparation for social interaction ===
Social stories can be used to communicate ways in which an autistic person can prepare themselves for social interaction. Comic strip conversations, a complementary technique developed by Carol Gray, are "visual representations" of conversations and social interactions that aim to help an individual understand social processes and increase their comprehension of other people's thoughts and actions.

=== Theatre ===
Social stories are used as part of Theatre Development Fund (TDF) Autism Theatre Initiative to "make theatre accessible to children and adults on the autism spectrum". Social stories which explain loud noises, needing a break, and moving through a crowd were made available prior to the performance.
