= Disability in Japan =

In Japan, a person with a disability is defined as: "a person whose daily life or life in society is substantially limited over the long term due to a physical disability or mental disability". Japan ratified the United Nations Convention on the Rights of Persons with Disabilities (CRPD) on 20 January 2014.

== Demographics ==
In 1998 the government estimated that there were 5,753,000 people with disabilities in Japan, constituting about 4.8% of the total population. The totals of the three legally defined categories were: 3,170,000 physically disabled; 413,000 intellectually disabled; and 4,170,000 have psychiatric disabilities. The physically disabled category was made up of people with the following impairments: 1,657,000 (56.5%) mobility impairments; 305,000 (10.4%) are visually impaired; 350,000 (11.9%) are hard of hearing or deaf; while 621,000 (21.2%) had "internal disabilities" such as heart disease.

== Legislation and government policy ==
Disability rights and policy in Japan have seen drastic reforms since the 1960s when the lack of rights of disabled people at the time began to be recognised as an issue by both the government and the general public. These rights are protected by both international law and domestic law. Japan ratified the Convention on the Rights of Persons with Disabilities (CRPD) in January 2014, following various changes to domestic law which addressed concerns raised by the CRPD.

According to Article 1 of the Disabled Peoples' Fundamental Law of 1993, Japan defines an individual with a disability as one "whose daily life or life in society is substantially limited over the long term due to a physical disability, mental retardation, or mental disability." In order to prevent discrimination and address the needs of those who qualify under this definition, Japan issued measures for the social wellbeing and employment of people with disabilities.

Japan signed the CRPD in September 2007, but took until January 2014 to ratify it. The long delay was due to various legislative amendments and policy reforms that had to be in place before ratification.

== History ==
The disability rights movement in Japan took many decades to develop. One of the earlier steps in forming welfare laws was the enactment of the Public Assistance Law, the Child Welfare Law, and the Law for the Welfare of People With Physical Disabilities following the Second World War. The latter of which was the earliest piece of legislation in Japan to offer support for those with disabilities. All the same, the aim of this Act was to help disabled veterans in their rehabilitation regarding their careers and those with disabilities who were not veterans remained dependent on relatives to support them.

The 1960s saw an increase in disabled children being separated from their families and placed in residential institutions, many of which were converted from those built for disabled veterans. At the age of 18, many of these children would be transferred to adult facilities where they would remain until death. Within the residential institutions, many human rights violations took place, including child residents being used as guinea-pigs for their doctors in surgical procedures and numerous incidents of sexual abuse towards female residents.

At the same time as this was going on, Aoi Shiba, a movement formed by people living with cerebral palsy, began gaining ground. They rejected the traditional Japanese notion that disabled people should be hidden by their families like a shameful secret and demanded that they had a right to live within the community. Aoi Shiba continued to challenge the way disabled people were treated across Japan through "sit-ins to stop inaccessible buses, worked against the compulsory segregation of disabled children in separated schools and organised protests against the Eugenics Protection Law, which legalised abortion when the foetus had disabilities."

Attention towards disability rights grew throughout the 1970s; an increasing number of people with disabilities were leaving their family homes and residential institutions in a move towards independent living, with the help of volunteer attendants. This increase in demand led to a deficit of volunteers, prompting calls for the government to establish programmes to aid disabled people in hiring attendants. It was not until 1986 when the Personal Attendants Program for Physically Disabled Persons was launched in Osaka City and by 1999, 153 hours of assistance were provided by the city to each disabled person.

Based on an Independent Living Centre (ILC) "run by disabled people for disabled people" set up in California in 1972, a similar concept was developed in Japan. A number of Japanese citizens with disabilities were trained in managing ILCs in the United States before returning to Japan to open an ILC in Tokyo in 1986. In 1991, the Japan Council of Independent Living Centres (JIL) was opened and, by 2006, over 130 ILCs existed in Japan that were associated with JIL.

The ILCs offered an independent living programme which aimed to build on the social skills, confidence, and attitudes of participants. This provided those with disabilities with essential skills for living in the community that were not offered in segregated schools.

In 2019, two disabled candidates were elected in the 2019 Japanese House of Councillors election for Reiwa Shinsengumi. "Yasuhiko Funago, 61, who has Lou Gehrig's disease, and 54-year-old Eiko Kimura, who has cerebral palsy, won Diet seats by priority in the group's proportional representation list". Funago is the first person with amyotrophic lateral sclerosis to be elected to the Diet and Kimura is an activist who has called for integrating people with disabilities into society. The election of the two candidates has been seen as a major advancement for the representation and the visibility of disabled people in Japan.

== International legislation ==
=== The Universal Declaration of Human Rights ===
Article 25(1) of the Universal Declaration of Human Rights states that "Everyone has the right to a standard of living adequate for the health and well-being of himself and of his family, including food, clothing, housing and medical care and necessary social services, and the right to security in the event of unemployment, sickness, disability, widowhood, old age or other lack of livelihood in circumstances beyond his control."

=== The Convention on the Rights of Persons with Disabilities ===
The Convention on the Rights of Persons with Disabilities (CRPD) includes eight guiding principles:

1. Respect for inherent dignity, individual autonomy including the freedom to make one's own choices, and independence of persons
2. Non-discrimination
3. Full and effective participation and inclusion in society
4. Respect for difference and acceptance of persons with disabilities as part of human diversity and humanity
5. Equality of opportunity
6. Accessibility
7. Equality between men and women
8. Respect for the evolving capacities of children with disabilities and respect for the right of children with disabilities to preserve their identities

Japan signed the CRPD in September 2007 but did not ratify it until 20 January 2014. Japan was the 140th country to ratify the CRPD.

In the time between Japan's signing and ratification of the convention, Japan revised its domestic legislation to conform to the convention. The government had intended to ratify the CRPD in March 2009 however the suggested policy changes were found to be insufficient and unlikely to have any major impact on disability rights. The ratification was consequently blocked by the Japan Disability Forum, a group made up of 13 organisations that act on behalf of the disability rights movement.

In September 2009, there was a change of government with the Democratic Party of Japan coming to power. In 2010, the new government set up the Committee for Disability Policy Reform which was made up mostly by representatives of organisations for people with disabilities or families of people with disabilities. Nearly half of the 24 members had disabilities themselves.

The committee made various recommendations to the government which were used to form a plan on achieving harmonisation ready for the ratification of the CRPD. The resulting strategy involved three stages; the first was to amend the Basic Law for Persons with Disabilities, the second was to renew legislation for disability services and the third was to enact an independent law which would prohibit discrimination based on disability.

Japan submitted a report to the Committee on the Rights of Persons with Disabilities in June 2016. This initial report contained comments made by the Commission on Policy for Persons with Disabilities, as well as documentation of the progress on implementing the Basic Program for Persons with Disabilities.

== Domestic legislation ==
The Basic Law for Persons with Disabilities (1970) aims to "promote welfare of persons with disabilities". Prior to ratifying the CRPD, the cabinet made the decision in June 2010 to revise this Act. Major amendments include recognising sign language as an official language, creating a new framework for disability consumer protection, improving accommodation for voting, and introducing measures to reduce crimes against disabled people. Additionally, a Disability Policy Committee was set up to ensure a full discussion of relevant issues on disability would take place before any changes are made to such matters.

Fundamental principles of the Basic Law for Persons with Disabilities are:

1. Every person with disability shall have a right to be respected for his or her individual dignity and lead a decent life.
2. Every person with disability, as a member of the society, shall be entitled opportunities to participate in social, economic, cultural and all other activities in the society.
3. No one shall be allowed to discriminate against persons with disabilities or violate their rights and benefits on the basis of disability.

The Elimination of Discrimination against Persons with Disabilities Act was enacted prior to ratifying the CRPD in June 2013 and came into effect in April 2016. The Act prohibits discrimination based on disability by private companies and the government and requires public entities to adapt in order to ensure that social barriers are removed for those with disabilities, assuming costs are not disproportionate.

=== Employment ===
In 2008, the Law for Employment Promotion, etc. of the Disabled Persons (1960) was revised to ensure that employers would provide equal opportunities to those with disabilities both during the hiring process (article 34) and while they are in employment, including wages, training and welfare (article 35). The Act also requires that employers ensure that adequate facilities to assist the employees' disabilities are installed, along with hiring assistants where necessary (Articles 36–2 and 36–3).

The Persons with Disabilities Employment Promotion Law includes a quota system which became obligatory in 1976, where a workforce is required to be made up of a certain percentage of workers with disabilities. The quota is reassessed every 5 years due to variations in employment rates. As of July 2026, the legal quota is 2.7% of employees in companies with 37.5 or more workers; 2.9% for prefectural educational committees; and 3.0% for other government bodies and independent administrative legal persons. When calculating the number of disabled employees, those who work part-time between 20 and 30 hours per week are counted as half a person.

As of July 2026, companies with 101 or more employees are required to pay levies of ¥50,000 per month for every person if they neglect to achieve the legally required quota. If an entity exceeds their quota, they can apply for an adjustment allowance of ¥29,000 each month for every disabled person they employ above the quota.

There have been various non-legislation based initiatives which have worked towards improving the rights of disabled people. One of these is the Hello Work offices which is a public organisation that acts to assist people with disabilities in finding employment. They go about this by collecting information from unemployed disabled people and offering this information to potential employers to find those most suited for each job. The offices then help to prepare the employees for these jobs and ensure the transfer to this work goes smoothly.

For employers who are unable to meet the minimum employment rate for those with disabilities, they are charged with a penalty through the payment system. The proceeds from this monthly payment are subsidized to companies that succeeded in maintaining the minimum employment rate to address any financial problems that coincide with the employment of individuals with disabilities. The penalty for companies with less than 300 regular workers is 40,000 yen per number of individuals below the rate compared to larger companies who would owe 50,000 yen per individual. For employers who manage to meet the minimum employment rate, for every person they hire above the rate they receive 27,000 yen.

Since the 2010s, the strict reliance on quota compliance encouraged the growth of specialized disability employment outsourcing businesses (障害者雇用代行ビジネス, Shōgaisha koyō daikō business). These third-party entities offer remote or segregated work setups, enabling client companies to fulfill statutory quotas without directly integrating disabled staff into core operations. While not illegal, the Ministry of Health, Labour and Welfare has raised concerns that such practices deviate from the law's intent. Public scrutiny heightened in May 2026, when media reports revealed that an Okinawa-based service provider, Thanks Lab, facilitated arrangements for major corporations where disabled workers were given no actual duties, leading an industry association to revoke the firm's accreditation.

=== Children ===
The Special Child Rearing Allowance Law grants ¥50,400 each month (with income limitation) to parents or guardians who look after a child under 20 years old with a serious disability and ¥33,570 each month if the child has a moderate disability. In addition to this, there is a welfare allowance of ¥14,280 each month which is granted to children with severe disabilities. After a person with a severe disability reaches the age of 20, they can claim ¥26,230 each month (with income limitation) to help with the costs that arise from their disability.

=== Voting rights ===
In 2013, people under guardianship ('adult wards', or 成年被後見人 (seinen hikōken'nin) in Japanese) gained the right to vote "when the 'disqualifying clause' that disenfranchised them was struck from the Public Office Election Law." The government had denied adult wards the right to vote on the grounds that "such people lack the 'mental capacity to adequately understand a situation'" and this made it "difficult for them to exercise individual judgment at the ballot box." In 2013, under pressure from domestic groups and in order to ratify the Convention on the Rights of Persons with Disabilities, which Japan had signed in 2007, the disqualifying clause was ruled unconstitutional and the Public Office Election Law was revised to remove the restriction on voting for adult wards, making Japan one of only 11 countries (Ireland, Italy, the United Kingdom, Austria, the Netherlands, Canada, Sweden, Norway, Finland, Ecuador, and Japan) to have removed all restrictions on the right to vote for people with mental health problems and/or intellectual disabilities.

== Social insurance permanent disability programs ==
Covering over 70 million employees and their families in case of an accident or unexpected illness, Japan's social insurance permanent disability programs also apply to those amongst the population with permanent disabilities. In order to be eligible for these pension provisions, it is required to pass a set of strict criteria that proves whether an individual has long-term impairment and limitations in their everyday living as a result of their disability. Two social insurance programs are available in Japan to those in need for long-term disability benefits. Those who are self-employed or unemployed qualify under the National Pension (NP) program and those who work full-time qualify under the Employees' Pension Insurance (EPI) program. This two-tier framework consists of the NP program employing a flat-rate system, in contrast to the EPI program which is based on the amount an individual earns.

== Sport ==
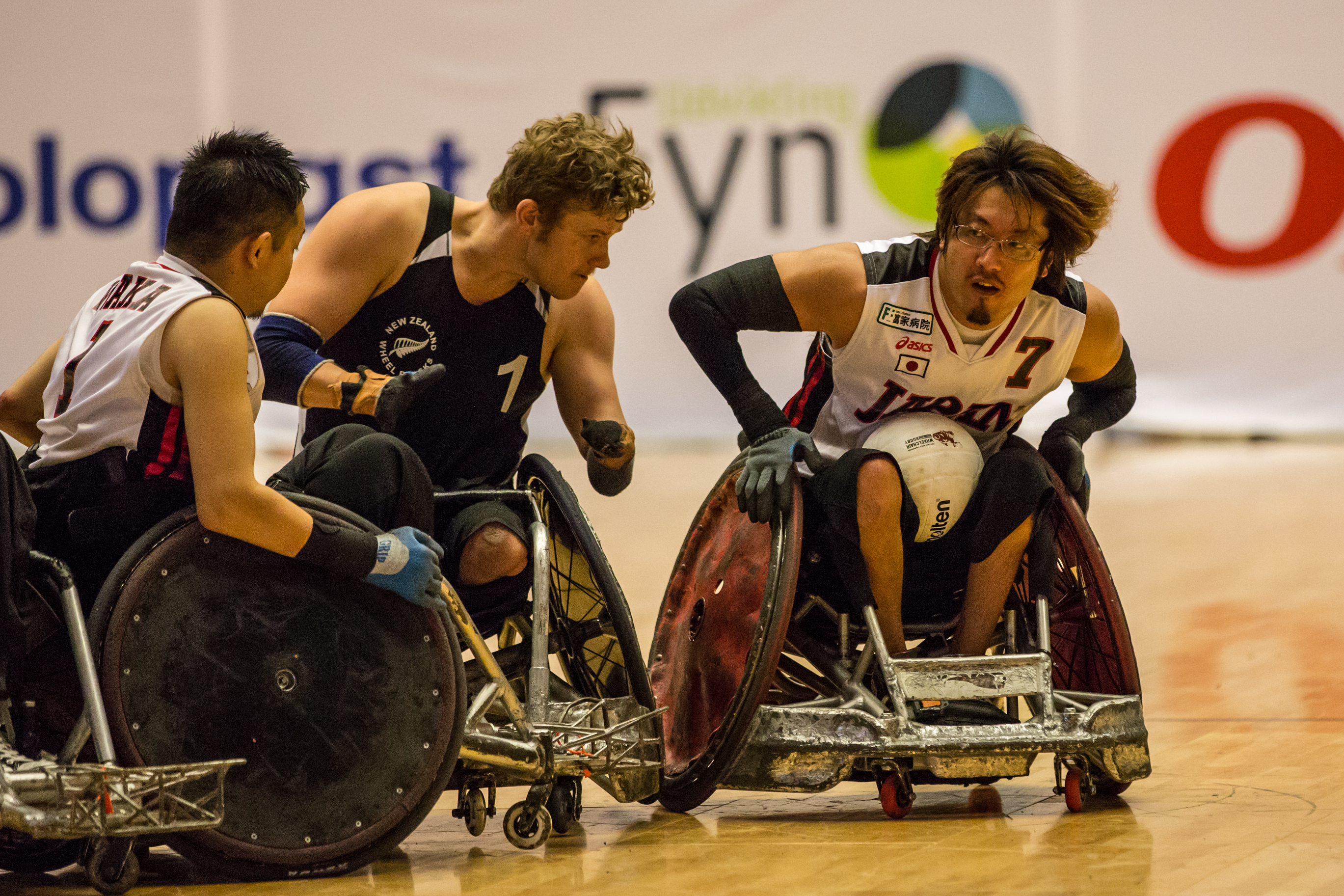
2014 IWRF World Championship

Japan made its Paralympic debut by hosting the 1964 Games in Tokyo. The country has participated in every subsequent edition of the Summer Paralympics, and in every edition of the Winter Paralympics since the first in 1976. It has hosted the Paralympic Games twice, with Tokyo hosting the 1964 Summer Games, and Nagano the 1998 Winter Paralympics. Tokyo is scheduled to host the Summer Games again in 2020. (moved to 2021 due to the COVID-19 pandemic) .

== See also ==
- Deafness in Japan
- Help Mark
- Sagamihara stabbings
