= Social narrative =

Learning tool for people with disabilities

Social narratives can be used to teach learners with autism spectrum disorders and other associated disabilities various skills, social situation, and narratives.

A social narrative is an evidence-based learning tool designed for use with people with autism spectrum disorder (ASD) and other associated disabilities. Social narratives often use personalized stories to teach a skill, identify a situation, or tell a narrative; some examples of social narratives may cover topics such as getting along with others, interacting with others, or experiencing a new place or activity. It is referred to as a story or a written explanation that tells the learner not only what to do but also what the situation is, with the goal of addressing the challenge of learners finding social situations confusing. Social narratives have been found effective for learners from preschool to high school ages in several areas such as social, communication, joint attention, behavior, adaptive, play, and academic.

== Concept ==
Social narrative is described as long story that could be employed as an antecedent intervention or not, for students that have behavioral challenges due to social and emotional development deficits. It depicts and explains social interactions, common behavioral expectations, and their respective social subtexts. According to the National Professional Development Center (NPDC) on ASD, in addition to teaching learners specific social behaviors and skills, it can also help them adapt their behaviors according to the social and physical cues of a situation and adjust to changes in routine.

A defining feature of the social narrative is that it is individualized and narrated from the child or the learner's perspective. The story focuses on relevant cues and provides the learners appropriate responses through examples. It is written by an educator according to the learner's instructional level and is often complemented by contents such as pictures and photographs that do not only confirm the information being conveyed but also promote self-awareness, self-calming, and self-management. For example, it can be in the form of a one-page symbolic depiction, a book with photographs, or a learning material (e.g. mobile app) that clearly depicts and explains relevant information.

== Uses ==
Social narrative can be used to support the learner with ASD understand various social contexts and develop new social skills, such as responding to a peer, or initiating a conversation with a familiar or new person. It can be used by various professionals such as teachers (both general and special education teachers), therapists, and professionals. It can also be used and implemented by the parent and family members. Social narratives can be applied and utilized in a variety of settings, for example, in educational and therapy based settings. Social narratives can be used to address issues, such as conversational skills in learners with ASD.

== Types ==
Social stories are considered a type of social narrative. In a particular story, the expectations – including those of others such as peers and teachers – are clearly and accurately described. Social stories, which are attributed to Carol Gray, is primarily used to describe a specific way of constructing a social narrative. This type of narrative follows a formula, which orients the story towards description instead of direction. Social scripts, on the other hand, describe specific comments and questions appropriate to given situations. It is written in scripted prompt format or videotaped statements or phrases that learners can use in social situations. The statements are simple such as: "Hi, can I sit here?", or "Can you help me?".

Both of these types of social narratives can be employed to instruct a learner on how to introduce themselves to others, ask for help, initiate conversations, and join a group of peers. Social scripts constitute another type of social narrative. These can be audio or written sentences or paragraphs that the learners can use in different settings and situations so that their ability to interact with others is enhanced.

Comic Strip Conversations, developed by Carol Gray, utilize drawings to illustrate what people say, do, and think in various situations. In a Comic Strip Conversation, the adult and the individual with ASD would briefly introduce the comic strip. Shortly afterward, either the adult or the individual with ASD can draw about the situation and present a perspective on what happened during the situation. A form of structure must be provided for the individual with ASD to understand the concept and skill being taught.

Power Cards are considered another type of social narrative. Power Cards are visual aids that capitalizes on an individual's interest. Power Cards can also be used to teach the learner how to appropriately engage in various social interactions, communicative behaviors, and daily routines. Although Power Cards are visual aids, they also vary in size. Power Cards are often written in first-person and describes how the child's identified hero can solve the presented problem.

Social Scripts are another type of social narrative. Social Scripts can be used to teach a learner the language to use in specific situations. The learner is given social scenarios in which questions, comments and statements that they can use when engaged in conversation with others. Social Scripts reduce the stress of social interactions. Social Scripts cannot be used in all social situations, as it has the appearance of the individual rehearsing.

Cartooning is a type of social narrative that uses cartoons to enhance the social understanding of the learner. Because visual symbols are helpful for making abstract concepts and events more meaningful, it is often used.

Social Autopsies, developed by Richard Lavoie, are used to help individuals understand the social errors or mistakes that have occurred. It aids in dissecting an error that occurs. This assists the learner in understanding the error, and clarifies the error that was made.

== Technique ==
The social narrative is usually written in first-person and the perspective of the learner so that the story matches his experiences, feelings, and behavior. It is often developed by an expert (e.g. educator, therapist) and the patient since it integrates new social information relevant to the patient. There are no strict guidelines when writing social narratives but the process usually involve the following steps:

1. Identification of the social situation for intervention;
2. Definition of target behavior for data collection;
3. Collection of data;
4. Social narrative writing.

Some guidelines for social narrative development include the use of language understood by the learner. The narrative is also written according to his comprehension skills. There is also the preference for the "I" statements (although "you" statements can also be used if it is more effective) and the construction of sentences using present and future tenses. After reading the narrative, the learner is provided an opportunity to participate in the situation that was identified. Key concepts is reviewed with the learner. While reviewing the key concepts, the learner is assess for understanding, to see if they understood the concept. If so, they continue. If not, reinforcements and prompts will be utilized to help the learner understand the concept of the social narrative. Data is collected to determine if the learner is making progress toward the goal.

== Goals and implications for use ==
The overall goals of social narratives is to teach appropriate behavior, make choices, playing appropriately with materials and peers, decreasing problematic behavior, understanding expectations, and increasing social interactions. Social narratives, when used, can provide a variety of positive effects such as initiating conversations with peers and adults, and enhancing self-confidence.
