= Size (surname) =

Size is a surname. Notable people with the surname include:

- John Size (born 1954), Australian horse trainer working in Hong Kong
- Nicholas Size (1866–1953), English writer
- Roni Size (born 1969), British record producer and DJ
