= Hidden Disabilities Sunflower =

British scheme and company

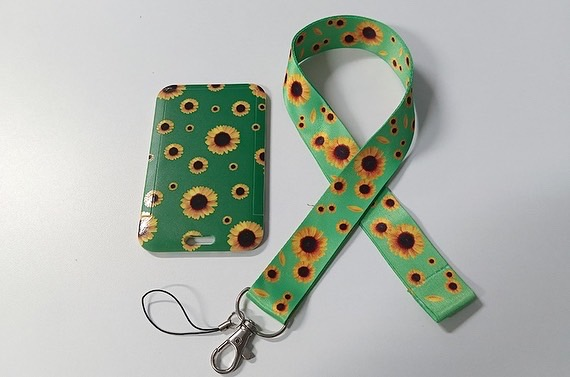
Canonical version

Hidden Disabilities Sunflower is operated by Hidden Disabilities Sunflower Scheme Limited, a private company based in the UK. The company was created in 2016 to help people with hidden disabilities navigate and find help in public places, by providing sunflower lanyards to provide for people with hidden disabilities to signal their need for extra help in public.

The sunflower lanyards are intended to let staff members know that the wearer has a hidden disability and as a result may take longer or need extra assistance. Staff members are trained to spot the lanyards and help the wearer.

== History ==
The scheme was created in 2016 by a collaboration with Chris Lyon - OEM, Gatwick Airport and various charities. The green lanyard and sunflower were chosen to represent confidence, growth, and positivity. In April 2019, London North Eastern Railway became the first railway company to recognise the scheme. By July 2020, all British railway companies had adopted the sunflower lanyard scheme as a means for passengers to let staff members know they may need more assistance. Sunflower lanyards are now recognised in various establishments across the UK. Sunflower lanyards and badges can be obtained for free at participating venues or purchased directly from the Hidden Disabilities Sunflower company website. Over three million sunflower lanyards have been distributed worldwide since the start of the scheme in 2016.

== International adoption ==
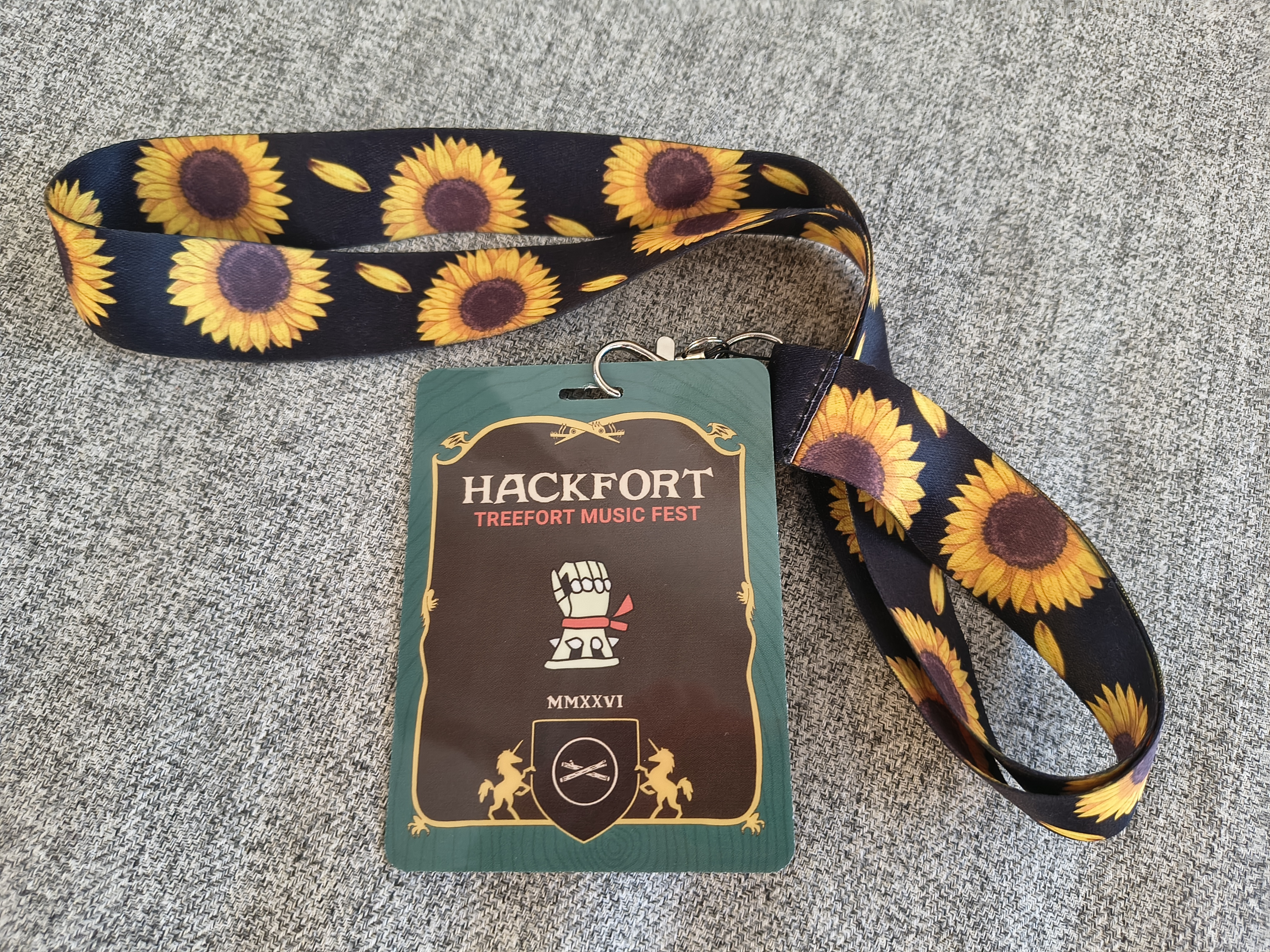
An autism lanyard at the tech "fort", the hacker ethic venue at the Treefort Music Fest

The Sunflower has been adopted internationally by transport related organisations as well as some other organisations including, universities, sports clubs, sports stadiums and financial organisations. Hidden Disabilities also offer an interactive route planner on their website that catalogues establishments where the sunflower symbol is recognized.

It has been adopted by airports in Australia, The Bahamas, Belgium, Canada, the Caribbean, Colombia, Croatia, Cyprus, Denmark, Finland, Germany, Iceland, Ireland, India, Italy, Japan, Lithuania, New Zealand, Peru, Poland, Singapore, Sweden, Turkey, The Netherlands, UAE and the US, as well as in the UK.

In 2024, Lego announced that they have partnered with Hidden Disabilities Sunflower to produce minifigures with the sunflower lanyard.

=== Ireland ===
It has been adopted by Aer Lingus, Bank of Ireland, Irish Ferries, the Irish Rugby Football Union and The Square, Tallaght.

=== New Zealand ===
In April 2025, Nelson Airport in New Zealand officially joined the Hidden Disabilities Sunflower programme, offering sunflower lanyards to passengers who wish to discreetly indicate they have a hidden disability.

=== Hong Kong ===
It has been adopted by Hong Kong International Airport as well as by HSBC Bank.

=== North America ===
In Canada, airports that have adopted the Hidden Disabilities Sunflower include Montréal-Trudeau International Airport and Vancouver International Airport.

Airports in the United States that have adopted the Hidden Disabilities Sunflower include Tulsa International Airport and Central Illinois Regional Airport.

=== South America ===
Lanyard use of mixed sunflowers and autism puzzles in Brazil

In July 2023, Brazil adopted Law No. 14,624, which recognizes the Hidden Disabilities Sunflower as the national symbol for hidden disabilities. This law amends the Brazilian Law for inclusion (13.146/15) to provide for the use of the Sunflower lanyard by people with hidden disabilities.

=== Switzerland ===
The Hidden Disabilities Sunflower has been introduced on a trial basis by the Swiss Federal Railways (SBB) since May 2025 to offer additional support for passengers with invisible disabilities. The initiative is gradually gaining wider social recognition as well, with private organisations offering benefits or supportive services to Sunflower cardholders, for example discounted cinema entry or educational support services.

== Abuse of lanyards ==
Hidden Disabilities Sunflower have criticised the resale of their products at inflated costs, and the sale of counterfeit products on websites including Amazon and eBay.

While some with hidden disabilities may be medically exempt from wearing a face covering, there were concerns raised during the COVID-19 pandemic that the lanyards were being abused by non-disabled people solely for the purposes of avoiding wearing a face covering. Such use was criticized by Hidden Disabilities Sunflower, who have stated that only people who consider themselves to have a hidden disability (whether diagnosed or not) should wear the lanyard.

== See also ==
- Help Mark
