= ISO 7001 =

Public information symbols standard

ISO 7001:2023
- Graphical symbols — Public information symbols
- The ISO symbol for "information"
- Abbreviation: ISO 7001
- Year started: October 1980
- First published: October 1980; 45 years ago
- Latest version: 4; 2023
- Organization: International Organization for Standardization
- Committee: ISO/TC 145/SC 1 Public information symbols
- Domain: Public information symbol design
- Website: www.iso.org/standard/77442.html

ISO 7001 ("public information symbols") is a standard published by the International Organization for Standardization that defines a set of pictograms and symbols for public information. The latest version, ISO 7001:2023, was published in February 2023.

The set is the result of extensive testing in several countries and different cultures and have met the criteria for comprehensibility set up by the ISO. The design process and testing of ISO 7001 symbols is governed by ISO 22727:2007, Graphical symbols — Creation and design of public information symbols — Requirements. Common examples of public information symbols include those representing toilets, car parking, and information, and the International Symbol of Access.

== History ==
ISO 7001 was first released in October 1980, with a single amendment in 1985. The second edition was released in February 1990, with one amendment in 1993. The third edition, the latest edition was released in November 2007, and has received four amendments in 2013, 2015, 2016 and 2017. The use of the symbols of ISO 7001 is recommended by the European standard EN 17210.

== Implementation ==
Example of the same sign using different contrasting colors

ISO 7001 sets out some general guidelines for how symbols should be utilized, though large aspects are left up to the decision of the individual or entity designing signage for their facility. Symbols were created with the goal of being able to stand alone, without any accompanying text. However, text can be used to further aid in communicating the message, particularly in a situation where a custom symbol has been designed for a unique situation not covered by standard ISO 7001 symbols. Specific sizes for symbols are not provided in ISO 7001, though symbols are designed with the goal of being clearly understood regardless placed on something as small as a floor plan of a building or as a large as a giant sign hanging from a ceiling in a large open space.

While symbols are intended and recommended to be reproduced as presented in ISO 7001, the ISO acknowledges that situations may exist where a symbol should be modified due to national or cultural needs of a particular situation. Though key elements and the intent of the original symbol design must be retained to ensure it will be effective.

No colours are specified in ISO 7001, with the only guidance being to ensure clear contrast between the symbol and the sign background, as well as the environment the sign is in. There is a clear recommendation against using colors specified in ISO 3864, due to possible confusion with safety signage using those colors. Of explicit concern is green and white, due to the risk of confusing a green and white 'PI PF 030' direction arrow symbol, for an ISO 7010 evacuation route arrow.

To avoid possible confusion with similar safety symbols of ISO 7010, symbols in ISO 7001 do not use the standard prohibition symbol consisting of a red circle with a red slash. Instead, either a red 'slash' or red 'cross' is used. A slash is used when an object is prohibited, and covers the entire symbol. A cross is used in situations where a behavior is prohibited, with the cross placed over the portion of the symbol depicting the behavior that is being prohibited rather than the entire symbol.

Example of the 'slash' on its own, positioned according to ISO 22727:2007

Example of the 'cross' on its own (Note: The position and size will vary according to the specific design of the symbol. This one has been centered for simplicity.)

Example of a 'slash' on BP 015: 'No headwear'. Note how the red slash is centered on the entire symbol.

Example of a 'cross' on BP 014: 'Do not smile'. Note how the red cross is specifically centered on the smile.

Example of a 'cross' on BP 019: 'Single person'. Note how the red cross is specifically centered on the two people in the background.

The slash and cross can be added to other symbols, such as a baggage cart to indicate 'no baggage carts'. ISO 7001 states that when symbols are designed, they should not have key elements that would be obstructed by the slash as positioned on the template provided in ISO 22727:2007. The slash or cross must be on top of the symbol, and should be red in color.

== Symbols ==
The standard consists of 177 symbols, divided into seven categories: accessibility, public facilities, transport facilities, behaviour of the public, commercial facilities, tourism, cultural and heritage and sporting activities.

=== Accessibility ===
All symbol reference numbers in this category are prefixed with "AC", for Accessibility.

AC 001: Full accessibility or toilets - accessible

AC 002: Slope or ramped access

AC 003: Accessible elevator or lift

AC 004: Accessibility, limited walking capability

AC 005: Accessibility, assistance dog

AC 006: Accessibility, personal assistant available

AC 007: Accessibility, hard of hearing

AC 008: Accessibility, vision impaired

AC 009: Accessibility, blind or low vision

AC 010: Priority access for elderly people

AC 011: Priority access for injured people

AC 012: Priority access for people with internal medical conditions

AC 013: Priority access for people with small children

AC 014: Priority access for expecting mothers

AC 015: Loop for the hearing impaired

AC 016: Priority facilities for obese people

AC 017: Priority seats for elderly people

AC 018: Priority seats for injured people

AC 019: Priority seats for people with internal medical conditions

AC 020: Priority seats for people with small children

AC 021: Priority seats for expecting mothers

AC 022: Priority seats for obese people

AC 023: Universal changing place

AC 024: Sign language accessibility provided

=== Public facilities ===
All symbol reference numbers in this category are prefixed with "PF", for Public Facilities.

PF 001: Information

PF 002: Hospital

PF 003: Toilets - unisex

PF 004: Toilets - male

PF 005: Toilets - female

PF 007: Drinking water

PF 008: Check-in or reception

PF 009: Lost and found or lost property

PF 010: Tickets or ticket sales

PF 011: Ticket validation

PF 012: Baggage storage or left baggage

PF 013: Baggage lockers or coin lockers

PF 014: Lounge or waiting area

PF 015: Smoking area or smoking allowed

PF 016: Post or Post office or mail box

PF 017: Telephone

PF 018: Baggage trolleys or carts

PF 019: Elevator or lift

PF 020: Escalator

PF 021: Stairs

PF 023: Nursery or baby care

PF 024: Cloakroom

PF 025: Shower

PF 026: Bath

PF 027: Trash box or Litter bin or Rubbish bin

PF 028: Way in or Entrance

PF 029: Way out or Exit

PF 030: Direction arrow

PF 032: Moving walkway

PF 033: Escalator, down

PF 034: Escalator, up

PF 036: Child health care centre

PF 037: Library

PF 043: Dentist

PF 044: Health care centre or Doctor

PF 050: Vegetarian food

PF 054: Museum

PF 062: Communication in the specified language

PF 063: Recycling – cans

PF 064: Recycling – magnetic type of steel

PF 065: Recycling – glass

PF 066: Recycling

PF 067: Pedestrian underpass

PF 068: Baggage delivery

PF 069: Baggage assistant

PF 070: Embassy

PF 074: Automatic sensor faucet or tap

PF 075: Hand Dryer

PF 076: Toilet paper

PF 077: Drinking water fountain

PF 078: Elevator for goods

PF 079: Men’s changing room

PF 080: Pedestrian overpass or footbridge

PF 081: Women’s changing room

PF 082: Recycling – plastics

PF 084: Hand sanitizer

PF 085: Health check

=== Transportation facilities ===
All symbol reference numbers in this category are prefixed with "TF", for Transport Facilities.

TF 001: Airport, or Aircraft

TF 002: Railway station, or Railways, or Trains

TF 003: Underground, or Metro railway station, or Trains

TF 004: Port, or Ships, or Ferries, or Boats

TF 005: Heliport, or Helicopters

TF 006: Bus station, or Bus stop, or Buses

TF 007: Tram, or Streetcar stop, or Trams, or Streetcars

TF 008: Taxi stop, or Taxis

TF 009: Rent-a-car, or Car rental/hire

TF 010: Bicycle, or Cycle facility

TF 011: Cable car

TF 012: Funicular, or Cable railway

TF 013: Chair lift

TF 014: Parking, or Car parking

TF 015: Flight departures

TF 016: Flight arrivals

TF 017: Flight connections

TF 018: Customs, or Baggage check

TF 019: Immigration, or Passport control/inspection

TF 020: Baggage reclaim

TF 021: Bicycle or cycle parking

TF 027: Airport bus

TF 028: Transportation Centre

TF 029: Rental bicycle

TF 030: Baggage weighing

TF 031: Quarantine

TF 032: Quarantine, animal

TF 033: Quarantine, people

TF 034: Quarantine, plant

TF 035: Water taxi, or Water taxis

TF 036: Self-contained camper van

TF 037: Security check

TF 038: Animal transportation

TF 039: Bus disembarkation

TF 040: Bus embarkation

TF 042: Meeting point

TF 043: Tour group meeting point

TF 044: Electric vehicle charging station or point

TF 045: Rideshare pickup area

=== Behaviour of the public ===
All symbol reference numbers in this category are prefixed with "BP", for Behaviour of the Public. (Note: ISO 7001 notes that symbols that relate to behaviours that endanger public safety are not included here. Symbols for regulating those behaviours are under ISO 7010.)

BP 001: Quiet please or Silence

BP 002: Stand on the left (or Right)

BP 003: Line up or queue in single file

BP 004: Line up or queue in twos

BP 005: Line up or queue in threes

BP 006: Dogs should be carried

BP 007: Take off your shoes

BP 008: Surveillance camera

BP 009: Biometric facial recognition facility

BP 010: Look to a point

BP 011: Manual passport control

BP 012: Move hair

BP 013: Open passport and place on scanning device

BP 014: Do not smile

BP 015: No headwear

BP 016: Wait

BP 017: No sunglasses

BP 018: Single person

BP 019: Proceed forward

BP 020: Do not share food or beverages

BP 021: Keep windows open

BP 022: Do not flush down a toilet

BP 023: Suitable to flush down a toilet

=== Commercial facilities ===
All symbol reference numbers in this category are prefixed with "CF", for Commercial Facilities.

CF 001: Restaurant

CF 002: Refreshments, coffee shop or café or buffet

CF 003: Hotel or Accommodation

CF 004: Money/currency exchange or Bureau-de-change

CF 005: Cash service or Cash dispenser or ATM

CF 006: Shops or Shopping

CF 007: Pharmacy

CF 008: Bar

CF 009: Filling station

CF 010: Conference facilities or Meeting room

CF 011: Internet café

CF 012: Foot care or Podiatry

CF 014: News stand or News kiosk or Newsagent

CF 015: Barber or Hair salon

CF 016: Cinema

CF 017: Car repair workshop

CF 018: Wireless LAN

CF 019: Shoeshine

CF 020: Snack machine

CF 021: Dance hall or ballroom

CF 022: Laundry service

=== Tourism, culture and heritage ===
All symbol reference numbers in this category are prefixed with "TC", for Tourism, Culture and heritage.

TC 001: Viewpoint or panorama

TC 002: Campsite or Camping

TC 003: Caravan park or Caravans

TC 004: Picnic area

TC 005: Play area

TC 006: Park, recreational

TC 007: Zoo

TC 008: Natural area with public access

TC 009: Hiking trail

TC 010: Location for Campfires

TC 011: Bird sanctuary

TC 012: Wetland reserve

TC 013: Hot spring or Hot tub

TC 014: Audio tour

TC 015: Indoor play area

TC 016: Packed lunch room

TC 017: Beach

TC 018: Planetarium

=== Sporting activities ===
All symbol reference numbers in this category are prefixed with "SA", for Sports Activities.

SA 001: Sporting activities or general sports

SA 002: Stadium

SA 003: Indoor swimming pool

SA 004: Sports hall

== See also ==
- DOT pictograms - United States version of this standard.
- ISO 7010 - ISO Standard for safety symbols.
