= Disabled Students' Allowance =

Government grant for disabled students in the UK

Disabled Students' Allowance (DSA) is a non-repayable grant available to disabled students of higher education in the United Kingdom. It is paid by the Student Loans Company on behalf of Student Finance England, Student Finance Wales, Student Awards Agency Scotland, Student Finance Northern Ireland, and the governments of Jersey, Guernsey, and the Isle of Man.

It helps to cover additional study costs that result from disabilities (both physical and learning) as well as mental health issues and long-term illnesses. The exact support given depends on the needs of the student. Examples include partial or complete funding for a sign language interpreter, extra printing, or a new personal computer.

Students on both undergraduate and postgraduate courses may apply for DSA. The student must prove eligibility by submitting a document as evidence of their disability. For medical conditions, this evidence may be a letter or report from a doctor or consultant. For learning disabilities, a report from a practitioner psychologist or a specialist teacher is used instead.

== See also ==
- Disability Discrimination Act 1995
- Education in the United Kingdom
- Equal opportunity
- Universities in the United Kingdom
