= Dimensions UK =

- Formation: 1976
- Type: Charitable registered society and housing association
- Purpose: Supporting people with learning disabilities, autism, behaviours of distress and complex needs
- Headquarters: Theale, United Kingdom
- Region served: United Kingdom
- CEO: Rachael Dodgson
- Website: www.dimensions-uk.org

Dimensions UK is a British not-for-profit charitable registered society and housing association that supports people with learning disabilities, autism and complex needs.

Founded in 1976, Dimensions' work includes supporting people with learning disabilities out of institutions and supporting them to lead fulfilling lives in their local communities through supported living and housing services.

The Dimensions group also includes Discovery, a partnership with Somerset County Council.

== History ==
Dimensions was founded in 1976 with a single telephone in a rented office. Its aims and areas of focus then remain largely the same today.

It now has around 7,000 staff across the UK and supports an estimated 3,500 people in England and Wales as of 2018.

Following research with the University of Kent's Tizard Centre, Dimensions introduced a new model of supporting people with learning disabilities and autism in 2015, known as Activate.

In July 2018 Dimensions launched the Learning Disability and Autism Leaders' List in association with The Guardian which honours achievements by people with learning disabilities.

=== Other areas of the Dimensions group ===
Waymarks, a charity that helps people with learning disabilities or autism who have forensic histories or risky behaviours to change their lives, was created in 2009 and fully merged into Dimensions Group in 2019.

In 2017 Discovery was launched in partnership with Somerset County Council to provide support for adults with learning disabilities in the region. Around 900 adults are currently supported in this capacity.

== Areas of Focus ==
Dimensions provides a range of disability services and campaigns on a variety of issues with an aim to create better lives for all people with learning disabilities and autism. Key services include supporting people out of assessment and treatment units (ATUs) and social care and into supported living environments.

In addition, Dimensions runs a number of small residential care homes across the UK and has around 1,000 tenants nationally. The group is registered by CQC in England It is regulated by the Care Inspectorate in Wales.

Dimensions uses person-centred thinking and positive behaviour support to help people with learning disabilities live full lives in their community and find supported employment. It operates the largest positive behaviour support team in the UK.

The group has published several independent guides for families of people with learning disabilities including guides on transition, unexpected deaths in care, moving out of assessment and treatment units and communication.

Dimensions works with local authorities to help them meet their statutory duties under the care act

== Recent Campaigns ==
Dimensions' recent campaigns include working with leading cinema chains such as ODEON, Cineworld, Vue, Showcase and Picturehouse to provide cinema screenings designed for autistic children and their families in more than 300 cinemas across the UK, branded as 'autism-friendly cinema screenings'. These are showings of children's films which feature lower volume and lighting than usual and allow audience members to move around freely during the film.

The organisation launched the 'Love your Vote' campaign for the 2015 general election

The #I'mWithSam campaign against hate crimes suffered by people with learning disabilities was launched in 2016 using 'Sam', a fictional character, to represent testimonies of abuse from people Dimensions work with. Since launching the campaign Dimensions has worked with the Crown Prosecution Service, police force, Law Commission and PSHE Association to update the criminal justice system, police training and school teaching.

The #MyGPandMe campaign aims to make GP practices more accessible for people with autism and learning disabilities and train GP surgery staff on making adjustments for people with learning disabilities.

Dimensions has also produced 'autism-friendly' resources and training for libraries (as with the cinema screenings, these changes are aimed at autistic children and their families). As part of the campaign Dimensions have also created resources for libraries, schools and children with autism to use to simplify the process of using libraries.
